= Dean Schwarz =

American artist and writer (1938–2026)

- Born: February 5, 1938; Cedar Rapids, Iowa, U.S.
- Died: April 18, 2026 (aged 88)
- Education: Pond Farm, Haystack Mountain School of Crafts
- Alma mater: University of Northern Iowa
- Known for: ceramic artist, painter, writer, teacher, publisher, historian

Dean Lester Schwarz (February 5, 1938 – April 18, 2026) was an American ceramic artist, painter, historian, writer, publisher and teacher. He was also the co-founder of the South Bear School (1970–present) by which he imparted to students a tradition of functional studio pottery. In the late 1970s, he founded the South Bear Press.

== Background ==
Schwarz was born and raised in Cedar Rapids, Iowa, a city with historical links to Regionalist painter Grant Wood. The son of a welder, his initial interests were in athletics.

As an undergraduate student at Iowa State Teachers College (now called the University of Northern Iowa), he developed an interest in ceramics, painting and other visual arts, and abruptly changed his major. He earned a Bachelor of Arts degree in 1960, and a Master of Arts in 1961. In 1960, he married Geraldine Fromm, a writer and literature teacher, with whom he raised six children. In their years together, he and his wife have traveled extensively throughout the world and have often collaborated on books and other projects.

While serving in the U.S. Navy in the early 1960s, he used his shore leaves to visit the studios of world famous potters, notably Shoji Hamada in Japan, and Bauhaus-trained Master Potter Marguerite Wildenhain at Pond Farm near Guerneville, California. He was stationed at a naval reserve unit in Waterloo, Iowa and at Cedar Falls, Iowa as a Personnelman 3rd Class Petty Officer. He was also in Kyushu, Japan.

He studied with Wildenhain at Pond Farm in 1964, then returned there for two additional summers, serving the third year as her teaching associate. He was faculty at the arts department of Luther College from 1964 to the 1970s. In 1968, he also studied with ceramic artist William Daley at Haystack Mountain School of Crafts.

Schwarz died on April 18, 2026, at the age of 88.

== South Bear School ==
In 1970, while at Luther College in Decorah, Iowa (where he taught from 1964 to 1986), Schwarz co-founded South Bear School, an innovative summer arts school (pottery, painting, poetry, et al.) in a former hospital house in Highlandville, Iowa (population 30), adjacent to a trout stream called South Bear Creek. In 1976, South Bear School was relocated to a wooded rural property outside of Decorah in a vacant 65-room nursing home. Marguerite Wildenhain was a frequent visitor both there and at Luther College. In her later years, she advised new students to study first at South Bear before working with her in California.

== Ceramic art ==
From the 1960s, Schwarz was primarily known as an innovative ceramic artist, whose output was prolific. His work is represented in numerous private collections, and in the holdings of museums and universities throughout the world, including, among many others, the Museum of Art and Culture (Wuhan, Hubei, China), University of Nottingham (Nottingham, England), Collection of King Olaf (Oslo, Norway), Pottery Museum (Mikawachi, Japan), Burg Giebichenstein (Halle, Germany) and the White House Collection (Washington, D.C.).

In later years, after a back injury, Schwarz had to restrict his activities in the creation of wheel-thrown pottery. The large pots that he created were the collaborative effort of himself and his son, Gunnar Schwarz, in which the latter did the wheel-throwing, while Schwarz designed the pots' surfaces and applied the glazes. In 2007, their work was featured in a large retrospective exhibition of Schwarz pottery (along with representative works by Marguerite Wildehain), titled Dean and Gunnar Schwarz: Pottery Form and Inherent Expression, at the Gallery of Art at the University of Northern Iowa (Schwarz’s alma mater).

== Research interests ==
In 1971, Schwarz was awarded a Fulbright-Hays Research Fellowship to study and teach ceramics in South Korea. At various other times, he has studied traditional pottery in Japan, researched Pre-Columbian pots in Panama, and worked as a restorer with an archaeological dig in Israel. In one of his trips, he met with the aging German sculptor Gerhard Marcks, who had been Wildenhain’s form master at the Bauhaus, and, in another, he and Geraldine Schwarz interviewed British potter Bernard Leach. These experiences, not unlike his earlier quest to visit the studios of famous potters, reflect his continuing interest in historical sleuthing, especially as it relates, non-exclusively, to the tradition of ceramic art.

Related to those inclinations, he and/or Geraldine Schwarz (often in collaboration with others) have written, compiled and sometimes published books having to do with historic issues, both local and international. Among these, for example, are Conversations with the Recent Past (Luther College Press, 1975), a collection of oral history interviews with rural residents in the vicinity of Decorah, Iowa; and Paddled Tails from Tattled Tales: An Autobiography of a Family (South Bear Press, 2001), consisting of archival photographs and oral history interviews of their own family members.

== South Bear Press ==
In the late 1970s, the Schwarz family launched a small book publishing company called South Bear Press, the first consequence of which was the publication of the third and final book authored by Marguerite Wildenhain, titled …That We Look and See: An Admirer Looks at the Indians, edited by John Nellermoe and Dean Schwarz (South Bear Press, 1979). In 2004, nearly twenty years after Wildenhain’s death, they produced a second volume pertaining to her life, titled Marguerite A Diary to Franz Wildenhain, edited by Dean Schwarz, consisting of her diary-like letters (never posted) to her husband, Bauhaus potter Franz Wildenhain, during their wartime separation in 1940, when his whereabouts were unknown. More recently, in 2007, after more than a decade of research in Europe, UK and the US, Dean and Geraldine Schwarz compiled and edited a large format, 770-page anthology on the history and legacy of the German pottery tradition, titled Marguerite Wildenhain and the Bauhaus: An Eyewitness Anthology (South Bear Press). In this volume are essays, memoirs, diaries, letters, interviews and other written documents by or about such Bauhaus- or crafts-related persons as Josef Albers, Ruth Asawa, Theodor Bogler, Lyonel Feininger, Walter Gropius, Trude Guermonprez, Shoji Hamada, Bernard Leach, Otto Lindig, Gerhard Marcks, Daniel Rhodes, Peter Voulkos and Frans Wildenhain.

In 2009, coincident with the 90th anniversary of the founding of the Bauhaus, Dean and Geraldine Schwarz published an essay in book form titled Centering Bauhaus Clay: A Potter's Perspective (South Bear Press).

== Bibliography ==
- Dean and Geraldine Schwarz, eds., Marguerite Wildenhain and the Bauhaus: An Eyewitness Anthology (Decorah, Iowa: South Bear Press, 2007), passim. ISBN 978-0-9761381-2-9.
- Dean and Geraldine Schwarz, Centering Bauhaus Clay: A Potter's Perspective (Decorah, Iowa: South Bear Press, 2009). ISBN 978-0-9761381-5-0.
