= Johannes Driesch =

German painter

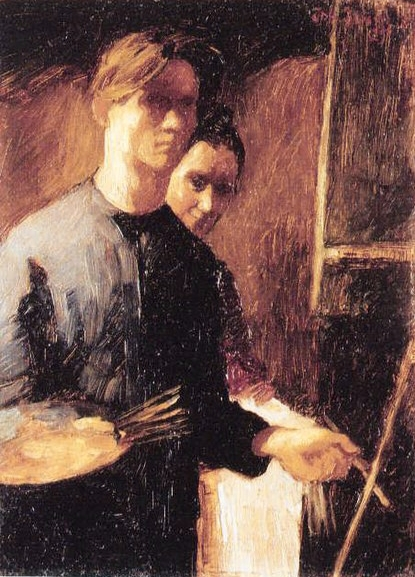
Self-portrait with Wife (1925)

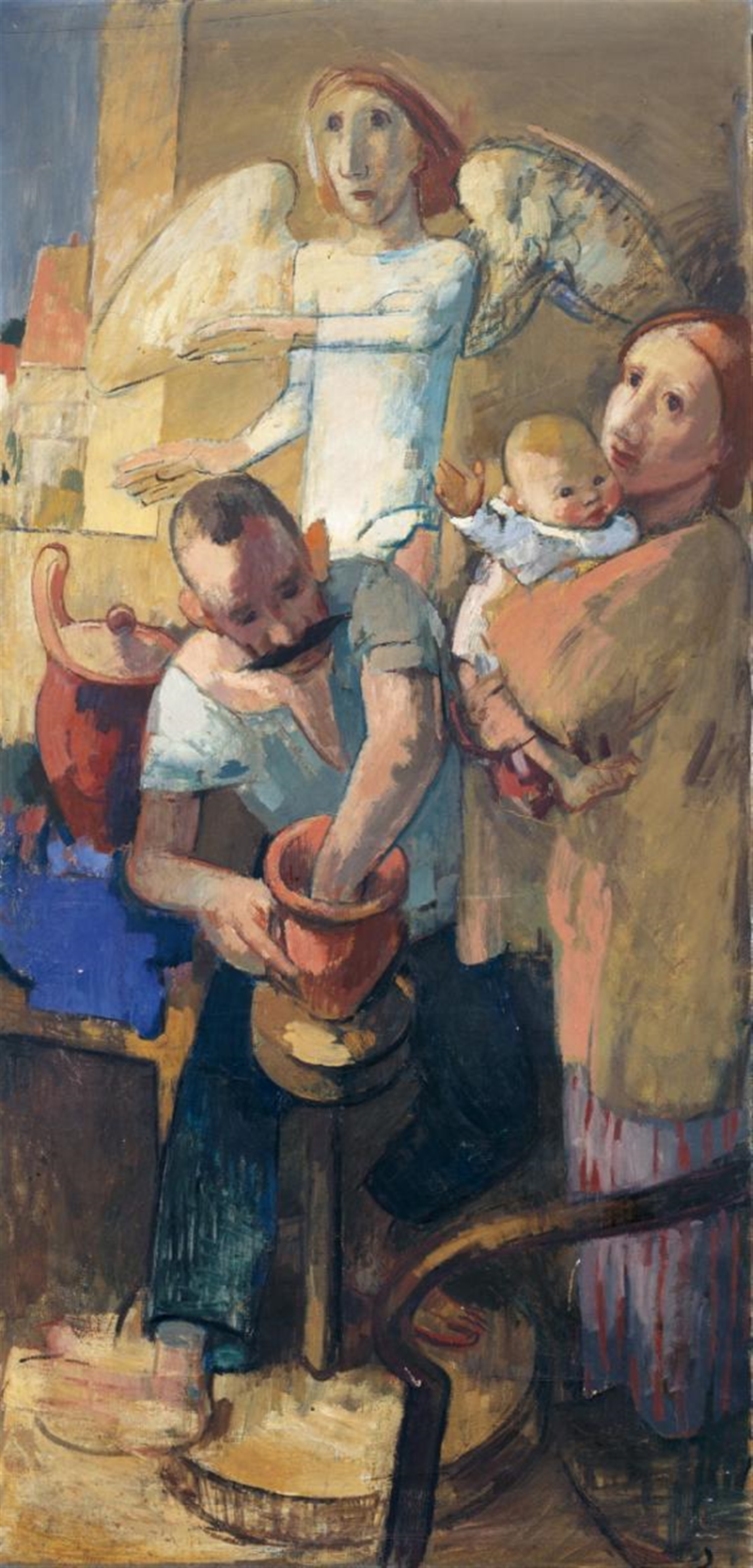
The Potter and His Guardian Angel (Erich Dieckmann (furniture designer) with Driesch and his family)

Johannes Driesch (21 November 1901, Krefeld – 18 February 1930, Erfurt) was a German painter, graphic artist, ceramicist and book cover designer. His favorite subjects were his wife, Lydia, and their children.

== Biography ==
He came from a large working-class family and began his career as an apprentice stonemason in Krefeld, then spent three semesters at the Kunstgewerbeschule there. Then, in 1919, he enrolled in the preparatory courses at the Staatliche Bauhaus in Weimar, where he studied with Johannes Itten and Lyonel Feininger.

In 1920, he went to the pottery workshop at the Bauhaus in Dornburg. His primary instructors there were Gerhard Marcks and Max Krehan. The following year, he married Lydia Foucar (1895–1980), a prospective student whom he had met in Munich the year before. They had four children together, which brought their studies to an early finish, as they had to establish a family business to provide income.

In 1922, he gave up pottery and became a free-lance artist, with the support of Marcks and the art historian, Walter Kaesbach. He then continued his studies by himself, copying the Old Masters. After a futile attempt to obtain a Professorship in Düsseldorf, he and his family relocated to Frankfurt am Main in 1928 and opened a studio there. He died two years later, following a brief illness, while working on a commission in Erfurt.

Most of his works were confiscated by the Nazi government in 1935, after they were classified as "degenerate art".
