= Max Krehan =

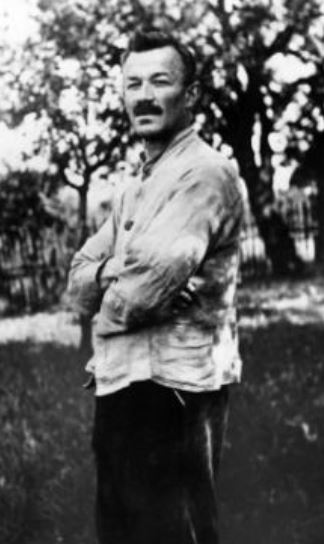
Max Krehan (early 1920s)

Max Krehan (July 11, 1875 – October 16, 1925) was a German Master Potter in Dornburg, Germany, who, in 1920, was appointed the Lehrmeister (Crafts Master) for the pottery workshop at the Bauhaus school in Weimar.

== Background ==
Krehan was the last in a long line of potters in a region of eastern Germany called Thuringia. His family had merged with the Wentzel family of Master Potters (or Töpfermeisters), when his great-grandfather, Johann Friedrich Krehan, married a Wentzel daughter in 1803. In 1900, having achieved the standing of Master Potter, Max Krehan took over the Krehan Pottery in Dornburg from his father, and thereafter worked with his brother, Karl Krehan, a Journeyman.

== Weimar Bauhaus ==
In 1919, when the now-famous Bauhaus school of art and design began in nearby Weimar, its founder Walter Gropius established a workshop in production pottery, with the intention that it would be taught at a factory in Weimar. In 1920, when these arrangements foundered, Gropius invited Max Krehan to move to Weimar and join the Bauhaus staff. Krehan refused to leave his Dornburg pottery, but he did agree to work with students at that location (about fifteen miles from Weimar). As a result, the ceramics workshop of the Staatliches Bauhaus in Weimar (State Bauhaus of Weimar) was set up as an annex in Dornburg, in the abandoned horse stables of the Grand-Duke of Sachsen-Weimar. Its two-man team of teachers were sculptor Gerhard Marcks (as Formmeister or Form Master) and Krehan (as Lehrmeister or Crafts Master). Among the students there that year were Marguerite Wildenhain, Gertrud Coja, Lydia Foucar, Johannes Driesch, Theodor Bogler and Otto Lindig.

Only five years later, Max Krehan died young and unexpectedly, at age 50. The Weimar Bauhaus had closed down on April 1 of the same year.

== Diary ==
Shortly before her death, Wildenhain (Krehan's student) gave to one of her students and close associates, American potter Dean Schwarz, a small, handwritten German diary, with an inscription on the title page that reads Dem letzen Töpfere seines Stammes (To the Last Potter of His Lineage). Years later, when translated, the diary was found to consist of letter-like entries from Wildenhain to Krehan, written after his death, from October 1925 to May 1926. Its heartfelt, candid content shows that Krehan and she had been lovers. This was verified when, in 2007, with the consent of her family, an English translation of this same diary was published in a book about the Bauhaus pottery tradition, titled Marguerite Wildenhain and the Bauhaus (Schwarz 2007, pp. 136-168).

== Sources ==
- Dean and Geraldine Schwarz, eds., Marguerite Wildenhain and the Bauhaus: An Eyewitness Anthology. Decorah, Iowa: South Bear Press, 2007. ISBN 978-0-9761381-2-9.
- Dean and Geraldine Schwarz, Centering Bauhaus Clay: A Potter's Perspective. Decorah, Iowa: South Bear Press, 2009. ISBN 978-0-9761381-5-0.

== See also ==
- Bauhaus
- Gerhard Marcks
- Marguerite Wildenhain
- Pond Farm
