= Otto Lindig =

German master potter

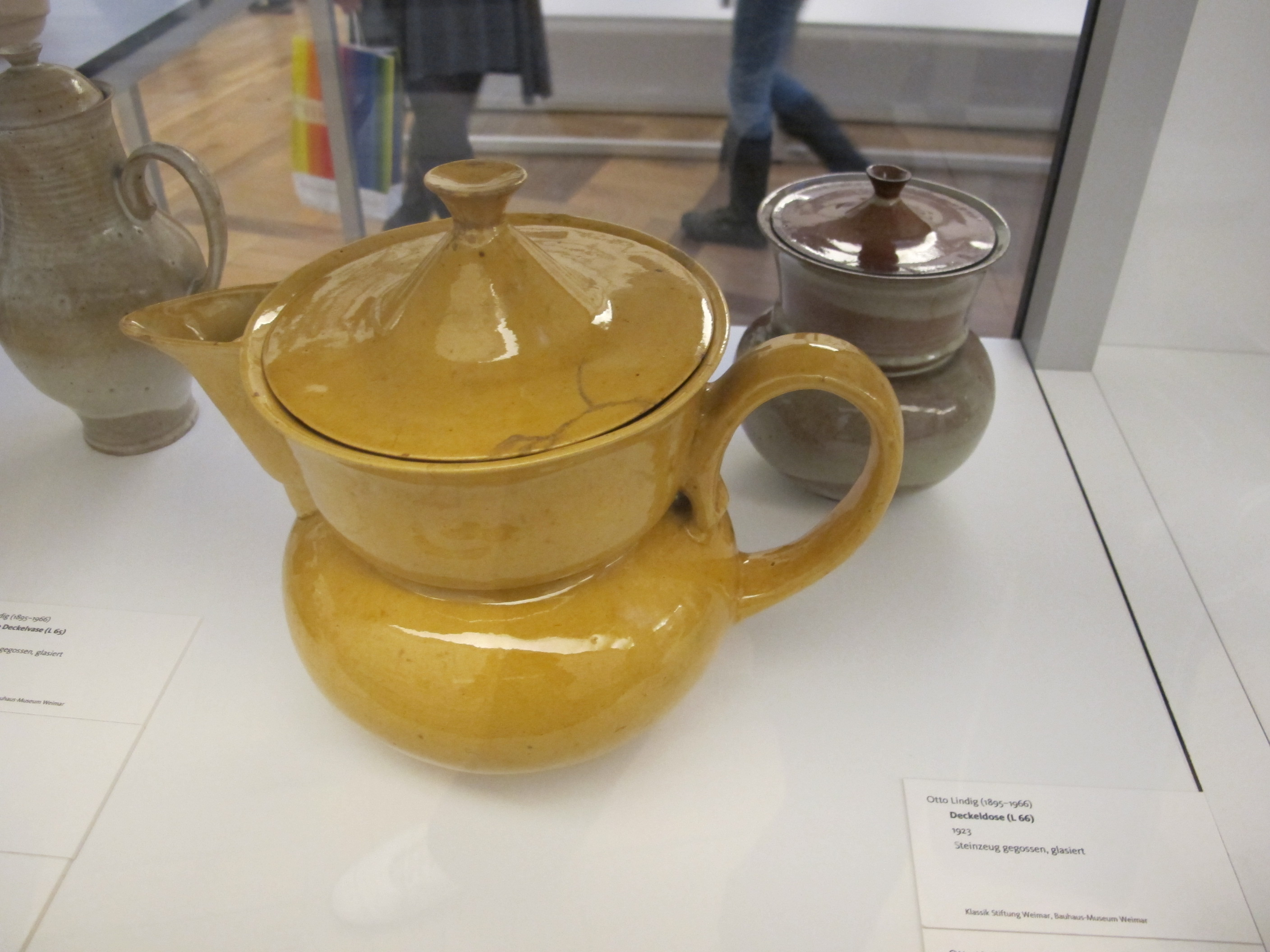
Pottery by Otto Lindig (1923)

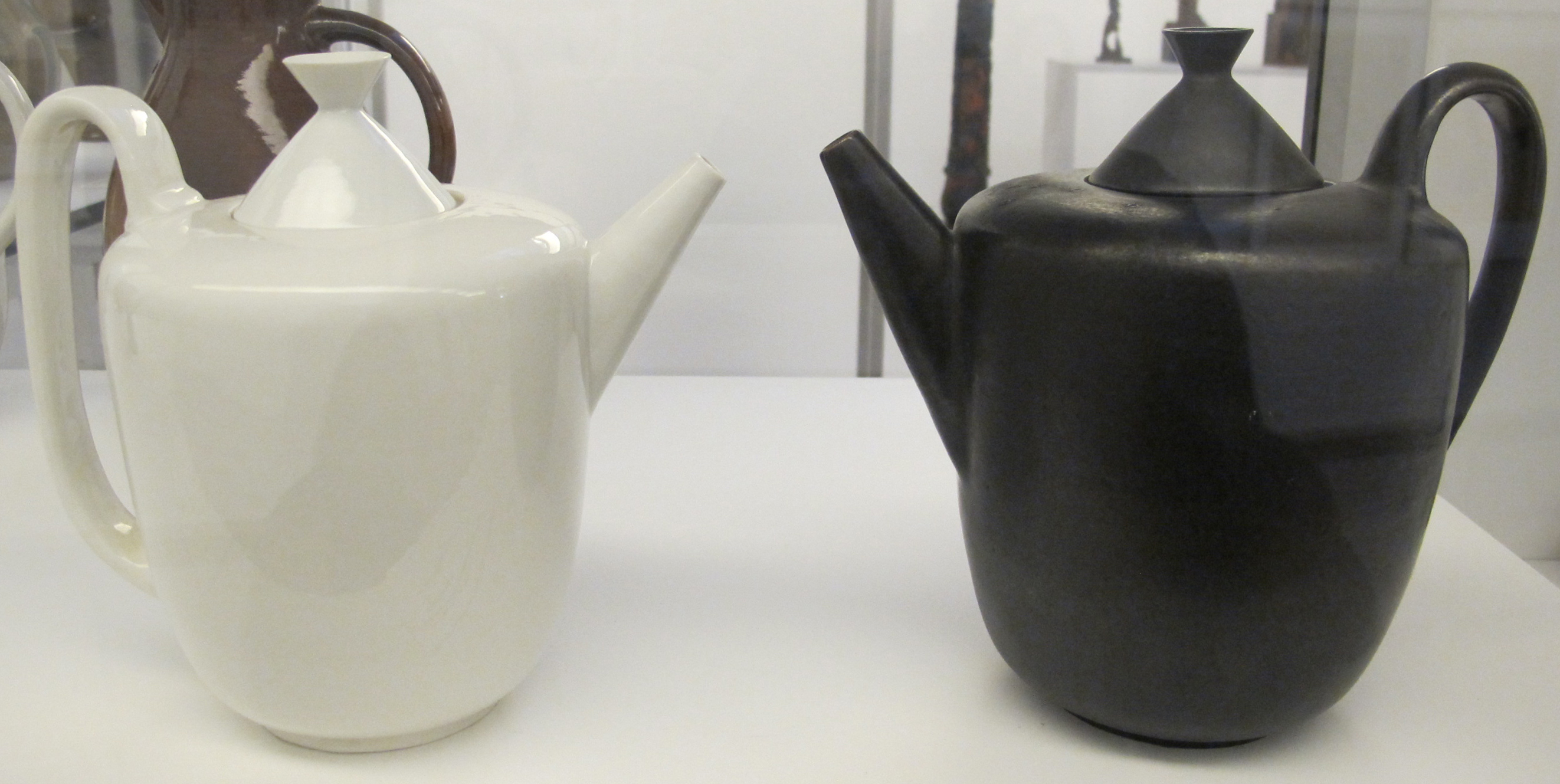
Coffee jugs, 1923

Otto Lindig (4 January 1895, in Pößneck – 4 July 1966, in Wiesbaden) was a German master potter who was a student and later a workshop manager at the famous Bauhaus art school in Weimar, Germany.

== Background ==
Lindig was born in Pößneck, Germany. Initially trained as an artist and modeler, he also studied sculpture with architect and designer Henry van de Velde in 1913-15 at the Weimar Kunstgewerbeschule (Arts and Crafts School), in the building that would soon become the first location of the Bauhaus. Shortly after the Bauhaus opened in 1919, Lindig enrolled in the program and, beginning in 1920, studied ceramics with sculptor Gerhard Marcks, his Formmeister (form master) and Master Potter Max Krehan, his Lehrmeister (craft master) at the school’s pottery annex in Dornburg on the Saale River, about fifteen miles from Weimar. At the time, he was one of four Bauhaus student potters who successfully completed their journeyman examinations (along with Theodor Bogler, Werner Burri and Marguerite Wildenhain).

In 1923, coincident with its first public exhibition of student work, there was a rift at the Bauhaus, in which some faculty and students were in sympathy with a shift in the school’s philosophy toward “Art and Technology: A New Unity,” while others opposed it (Marcks and Krehan in particular). In contrast, Lindig and Bogler, who sometimes collaborated, were willing and eager to learn about machine production. In 1924, they were put in charge of an experimental production workshop (housed in a remodeled stable down the hill from the Krehan Pottery) in which they developed slip-cast molds that could be used to mass-produce ceramic containers. Marcks was put in charge of both the "upper" and "lower" workshops.

== Later life ==
In 1925, the Bauhaus moved to Dessau, at which time its pottery workshop was discontinued. Remaining in Dornburg, Lindig continued as manager of the workshop, referred to as the Ceramics Department of the State Building School of Weimar, until 1930. That year, he leased the building for his own purposes, and continued to manage the workshop until 1947, at which time he joined the faculty at the Landeskunstschule (Regional Art School) in Hamburg, where his former master Gerhard Marcks had been teaching sculpture since the end of World War II.

== Sources ==
- Karen McCready. Art Deco and Modernist Ceramics. London: Thames and Hudson, 1995 | ISBN 978-0-500-27825-3
- Jeannine Fiedler and Peter Feierabend, eds. Bauhaus. Cologne, Germany: Konemann, 1999 | ISBN 3-8290-2593-9
- Mel Byars. The Design Encyclopedia. New York: The Museum of Modern Art, (1994) 2004 | ISBN 0-87070-012-X
- Dean and Geraldine Schwarz, eds. Marguerite Wildenhain and the Bauhaus: An Eyewitness Anthology. Decorah, Iowa: South Bear Press, 2007 | ISBN 978-0-9761381-2-9
