= Frans Wildenhain =

German sculptor

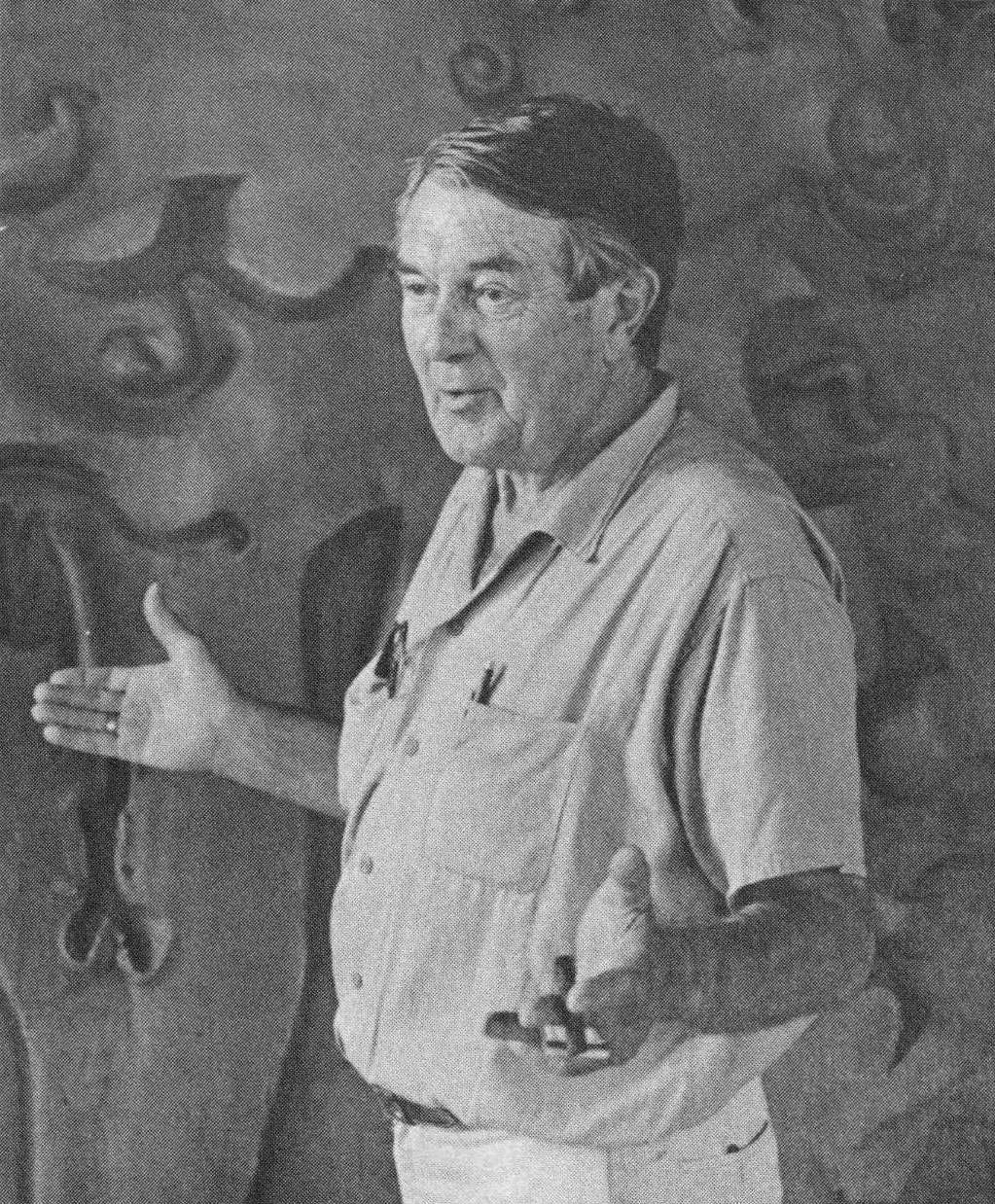
- Wildenhain in 1972
- Born: June 5, 1905; Leipzig, Germany
- Died: January 25, 1980 (aged 74); Rochester, New York, U.S.
- Occupations: Potter, sculptor

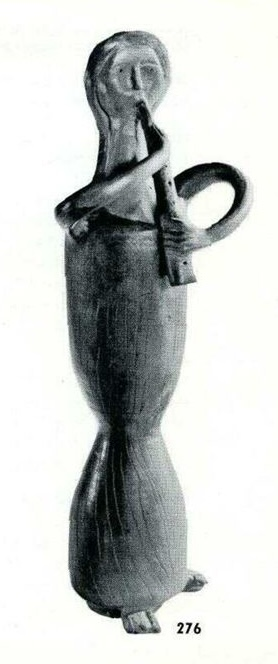
"Flute player", ceramic sculpture from Craftsmanship in a Changing World, 1956

Frans Wildenhain also known as Franz Rudolf Wildenhain (June 5, 1905 – January 25, 1980) was a Bauhaus-trained German potter and sculptor, who taught for many years at the School for American Craftsmen (now School for American Crafts) at the Rochester Institute of Technology in Rochester, New York.

== Bauhaus and after ==
Born in Leipzig, Germany, Wildenhain's early artistic training was in drawing, design and lithography. In February 1924, he enrolled at the Bauhaus in Weimar, where he completed the foundations or preparatory course under László Moholy-Nagy. He also studied with Paul Klee, and, beginning in November 1924, with Gerhard Marcks and Max Krehan at the Bauhaus pottery workshop in Dornburg. Among the other potters there was Marguerite Friedlaender, his future wife.

When the Bauhaus moved to Dessau in 1925, pottery was dropped from its curriculum. Marcks moved to the State School of Applied Art at Burg Giebichenstein, Halle, where he soon became the director. The following year, when Friedlaender became the head of that school’s pottery workshop, Wildenhain moved with her to resume his student training there. He became a Master Potter in 1930, the same year in which they were married, after which she was professionally known as Marguerite Wildenhain.

In 1933, when the Nazis took over Germany, Marguerite was dismissed from her position, because of her Jewish ancestry. She and Frans then moved to Putten, the Netherlands, where they set up a pottery workshop called Het Kruikje (Little Jug). In March 1940, she was able to emigrate to the U.S. (just two months in advance of the German invasion of the Netherlands), but he (a non-Jewish German citizen) was not allowed to follow her. In 1941, he moved to Amsterdam, where he taught briefly at the Arts and Crafts School, and also studied sculpture with Jan Bronner at the Rijksacademie. By 1943, he had been drafted into the German Army, and in the following year took part in the Battle of Arnhem. In April 1945, he became a deserter and was hidden from authorities by friends in Amsterdam.

== Pond Farm ==
In the months after her emigration to the U.S. in 1940, Marguerite had almost no word of the whereabouts of her husband. From May 10 (the day of the German invasion of the Netherlands) until September 10, 1940, she wrote unmailed letters to him, in the form of a diary, as she slowly worked her way across the U.S., from New York to California. These letters have since been published in Marguerite: A Diary to Franz Wildenhain edited by Dean Schwarz (2004). In 1942, she settled at Pond Farm, an artists’ colony near Guerneville, California, established by Gordon and Jane Herr, who had been in contact with the Wildenhains in the Netherlands in 1939.

After a separation of about seven years, Frans and Marguerite Wildenhain were finally reunited in 1947, when at last he was granted a visa. He too joined the community at Pond Farm, where he worked as an artist and teacher with his wife, fiber artist Trude Guermonprez, jewelry designer Victor Ries, and the Herrs.

== Later years ==
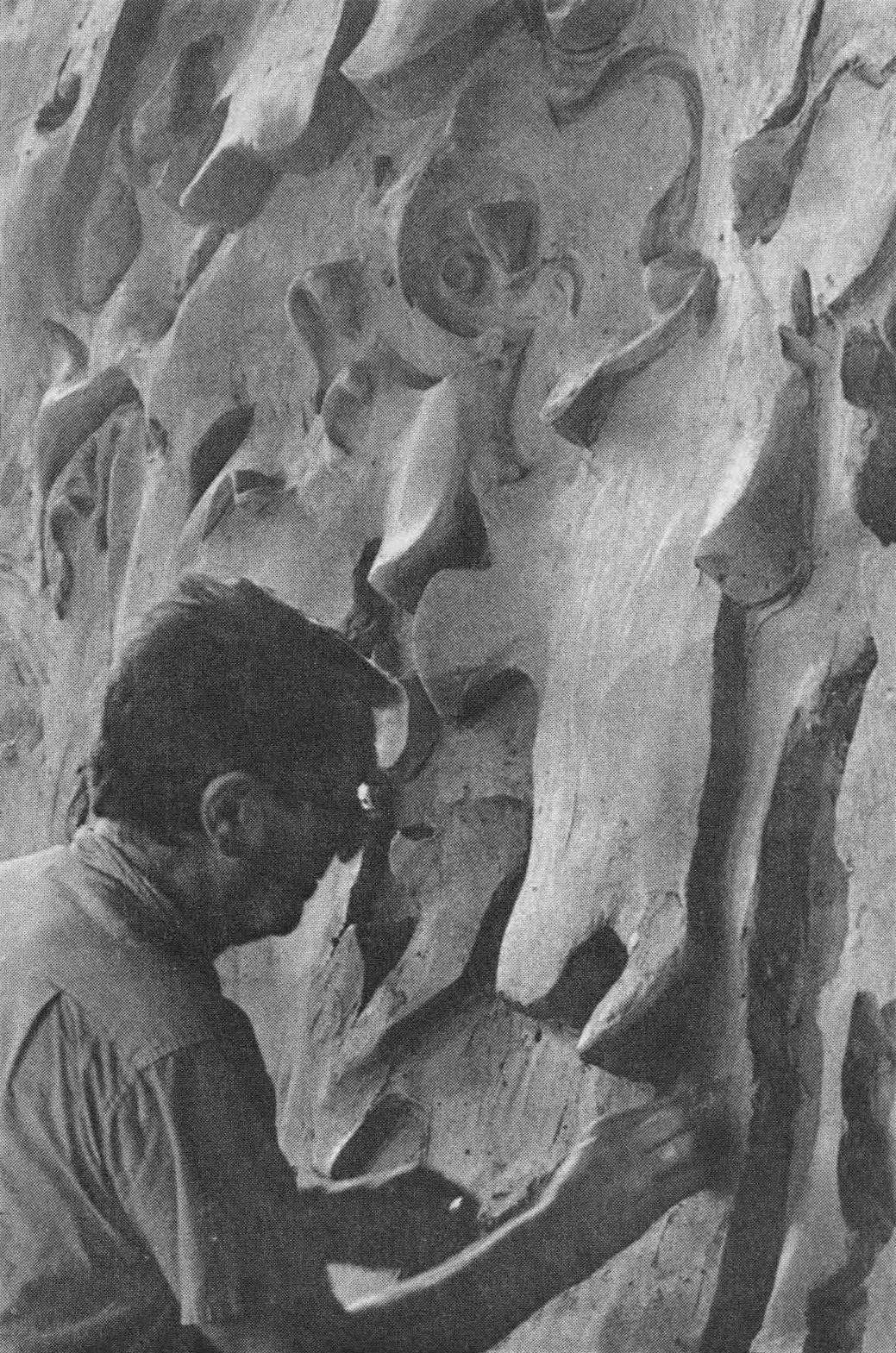
Wildenhain working on a clay mural at the Rochester Institute of Technology in 1972

By 1950, the Wildenhain's marriage had fallen apart, and Frans then accepted an offer to join the faculty of the School of American Craftsmen (now School for American Crafts) at the Rochester Institute of Technology in Rochester, New York, where he taught for 20 years. Among his graduate students were future noted ceramicist Ron Meyers, for whom he served as MFA thesis advisor, and the late Alec Hazlett, who was a ceramicist in Rochester New York. Frans and Marguerite's divorce became final in 1952, and Frans subsequently remarried, to Marjorie McIlroy (who died in 1967), and then to Elisabeth (Lili) Brockardt, a weaver and textile artist. He died in Rochester in 1980.

== Awards and collections ==
Frans Wildenhain received numerous prizes for his artwork, from (among others) the International Exposition in Paris (1939), the Albright Art Gallery (1952), the Brussels World's Fair (1958), and a Guggenheim Fellowship (1958). He was also a Fellow of the American Crafts Council. His work is in the collections of the Stedelijk Museum (Amsterdam), Smithsonian Institution (Washington, DC), Everson Museum (Syracuse, NY), Seattle Art Museum, the Art Institute of Chicago, Luther College (Decorah, IA), the Metropolitan Museum of Art (New York City), the Victoria and Albert Museum (London), and the University of Michigan Museum of Art (Ann Arbor, MI).

The largest collection of his work (comprising over 300 works) is at Rochester Institute of Technology (Rochester, NY). An exhibition principally featuring Wildenhain ceramics from the collection will be on view from August 20, 2012 to October 2, 2012 at Rochester Institute of Technology. The exhibition simultaneously will be held on campus at both Bevier Gallery and Dyer Arts Center. There will be an exhibition catalogue. The exhibition is accompanied by a 256-page hard cover catalogue (Frans Wildenhain 1950-75: Creative and Commercial American Ceramics at Mid-Century) with color photographs of all ceramics displayed, black and white archival photographs, and five scholarly essays: a biography of Frans Wildenhain, a history of the School for American Craftsmen, Wildenhain's work in the context of mid-century modern studio pottery, Wildenhain's role in monetizing and creating commercial acceptance for hand-crafted art at his Shop One artist's cooperative, and an interview with the RIT collection's donor.

== See also ==
- Marguerite Wildenhain
- Pond Farm
- Bauhaus
- Gerhard Marcks

== Sources ==
- Dean and Geraldine Schwarz, eds., Marguerite Wildenhain and the Bauhaus: An Eyewitness Anthology. Decorah, IA: South Bear Press, 2007. ISBN 978-0-9761381-2-9.
- Dean Schwarz, ed., Marguerite A Diary to Franz Wildenhain. Decorah, IA: South Bear Press, 2004. ISBN 0-9761381-1-5.
- Ruth R. Kath, The Letters of Gerhard Marcks and Marguerite Wildenhain 1970-1981: A Mingling of Souls. Ames, IA: Iowa State University Press, 1991.
- Bruce A. Austin, Frans Wildenhain 1950-75: Creative and Commercial American Ceramics at Mid-Century. Rochester, NY: Printing Applications Lab, 2012. ISBN 978-0-615-64527-8
