= Pond Farm =

Historic place near Guerneville, California

Coordinates: 38.552171°N 122.999991°W

- Pond Farm Pottery Historic District
- U.S. National Register of Historic Places
- U.S. National Historic Landmark District
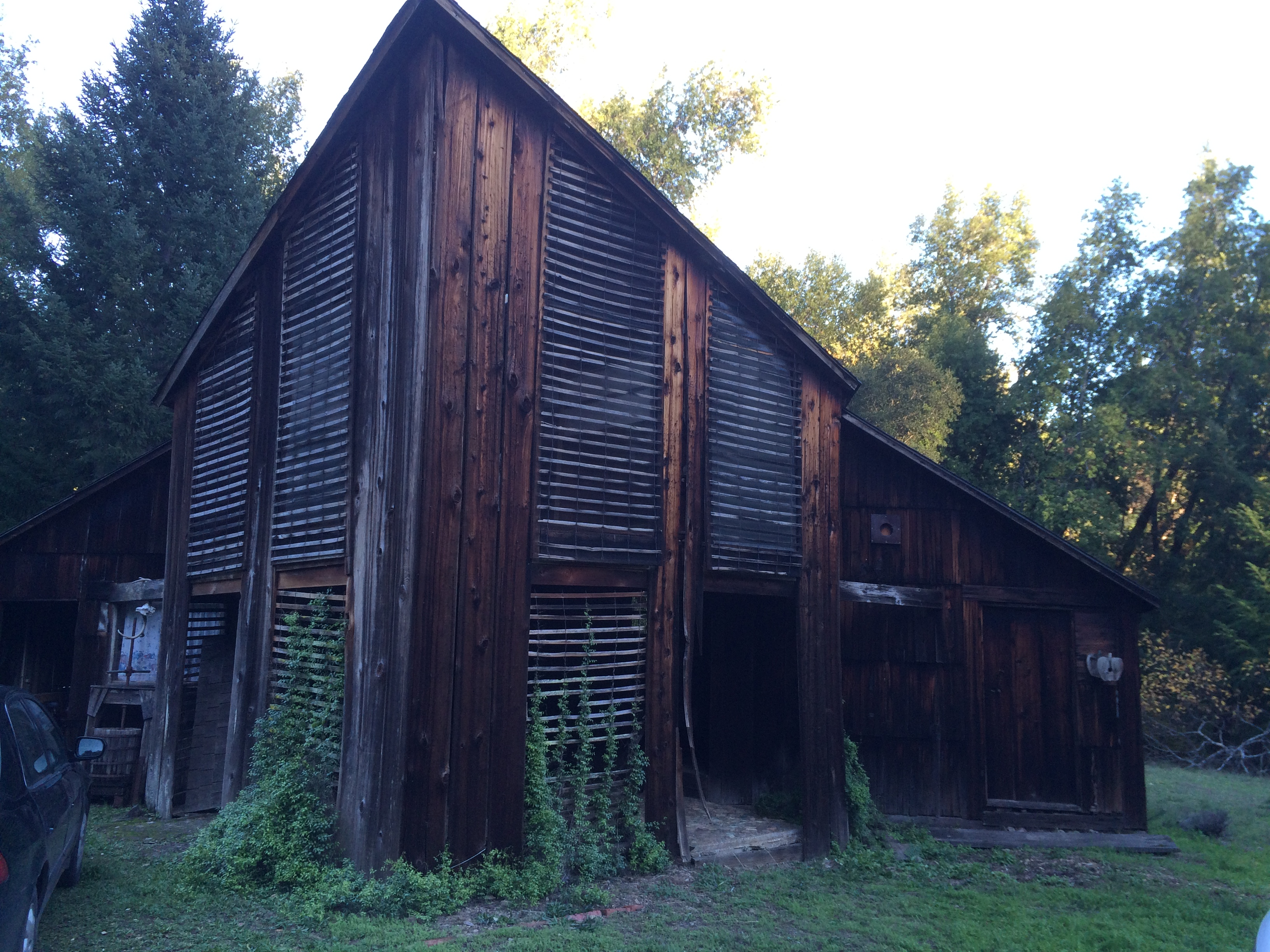
- Pond Farm Exterior of Barn / Workshop which contains potter's wheels as used by Marguerite Wildenhain
- Location: 17000 Armstrong Woods Road, Austin Creek State Recreation Area, Guerneville, California
- NRHP reference No.: 14000307 (NRHP listing); 100009799 (NHL designation)

Significant dates
- Added to NRHP: June 17, 2014
- Designated NHLD: December 11, 2023

Pond Farm (also known as Pond Farm Workshops) was an American artists’ colony that began in the 1940s and, in one form or another, continued until 1985. It is located near the Russian River resort town of Guerneville, California, about 75 mi (120 km) north of San Francisco. Situated on a hilltop 600 ft (180 m) above the Armstrong Redwoods State Reserve, Pond Farm began around 1939-40 when a San Francisco-based couple named Gordon and Jane Herr (architect and writer, respectively) acquired a portion of property called Rancho Del Lago or the Walker Ranch. Initially 250 acres (1.0 km^{2}), their property was later expanded to 400 acres (1.6 km^{2}). Because one of its primary features was a large pond, the Herrs renamed this setting Pond Farm. It includes two small residences and a historic barn repurposed as a pottery studio.

== Workshops ==
Inspired by such precedents as the Bauhaus, Eliel Saarinen’s Cranbrook Academy of Art, Black Mountain College, and Frank Lloyd Wright’s Taliesin, the Herrs envisioned Pond Farm as an artists’ community that would in part support itself through summer workshops. According to their son (Jonathan Herr), Gordon Herr regarded Pond Farm as “a sustainable sanctuary for artists away from a world gone amuck,” while for Jane Herr, “it was a new beginning after rejecting conventional city upbringing” (Schwarz 2007, p. 315). Working together, the Herrs became able practitioners of homestead farming. They raised a wide variety of livestock; planted fruit orchards, nut trees and vegetable gardens; and established several fish ponds.

In 1939, Gordon Herr traveled to Europe to search for artists whose beliefs and personalities might be compatible with his own. While in Putten, the Netherlands, he met the proprietors of the Het Kruike (Little Jug) pottery shop. They were Frans Wildenhain and his wife Marguerite Wildenhain (née Friedlaender), who had moved to Holland from Germany, where both had studied pottery at the Weimar Bauhaus. Herr urged them to emigrate to the U.S., in order to become a part of Pond Farm Workshops. The Wildenhains hesitated initially, but only six months later, when the Nazis invaded Poland, they wrote to Herr, asking if his offer stood. It did, and on March 3, 1940, Marguerite departed for the U.S. Her husband, however, was left behind, because the quota for German citizens had been filled. She was Jewish, he was not.

Eventually, Marguerite Wildenhain ended up in California and (having explored other options) decided to join the Herrs’ Pond Farm Workshops. She moved to Pond Farm in 1942, helped to put in water lines, established a garden, built a house and, working with Gordon Herr, restored and redesigned a barn that became her pottery workshop. Later, in 1949, on property adjacent to the entrance of the Armstrong Redwood Forest, the Herrs began construction of a building called the Hexagon House, where students could be housed and fed, and where public gatherings could be held.

== Resident artists ==
Marguerite Wildenhain was the first artist to accept the Herrs’ invitation to join the Pond Farm Workshops. In 1947, they were joined by Frans or Franz Wildenhain, who, having been drafted into the German Army during World War II, had been separated from his wife for seven years. Franz would teach sculpture, while two other European artists who joined the colony in 1949, Trude Guermonprez and Victor Ries, taught weaving and metals, respectively. Gordon Herr taught architecture, and Jane Herr served as an informal business manager. In addition to the resident artists, others participated as visiting artists and instructors, including Jean Varda (collage), David Stewart (sculpture and pottery), Claire Falkenstein (painting), Lucienne Bloch (fresco), Stephen Dimitroff (fresco), Harry St. John Dixon (metals) and others.

It appears that the Workshop's first summer session took place in 1949. Unfortunately, it would close only a few years later in 1953. Given the strong survival instincts of the artists, they soon proved incompatible. In the words of Tim Tivoli Steele (the Herrs’ grandson), “In the end, the trait that all the artists had relied on to survive the war and follow their visions—the strength of their personalities—would also contribute to the demise of the Workshops. Constant bickering tore the group apart” (Steele 1992, p. 3). Around the same time period, one of the Herr children died of mushroom poisoning, the Wildenhains’ volatile marriage collapsed, and Jane Herr developed breast cancer and died in 1952.

== Pottery ==
When Pond Farm Workshops fell apart in 1953, nearly all the residents left. Thereafter, a school and workshop on the site, called Pond Farm Pottery, were carried on by the community's only remaining artist, Bauhaus potter Marguerite Wildenhain, who continued to offer instruction through 1980. Wildenhain was known for being thorough in her teachings, making newcomers start with dog dishes and learning all of the throwing steps before moving on to more advanced pottery. Among her students was Dean Schwarz, co-founder of South Bear School, who studied at Pond Farm during the 1960s. University of Utah Professor of Art, Dorothy Bearnson, participated in seven summer workshops with Wildenhain between 1947 and 1964.

As early as 1963, the State of California had used its powers of eminent domain to require Pond Farm residents to sell their property to the state, in order to expand the Austin Creek State Recreation Area. Gordon Herr was forced to move, but, in response to appeals by her students, it was decided that Wildenhain could continue to live on the property until her death.

== Designations and state ownership ==
When Wildenhain died in 1985, her property reverted to the State of California and became part of Austin Creek State Recreation Area. In 2013, the site was awarded $443,245 in Prop 84 Cultural Stewardship funding to stabilize and the house and barn. The site has been designated a "National Treasure" by the National Trust for Historic Preservation.

The complex was added to the National Register of Historic Places in 2014, and was designated a National Historic Landmark in 2023.

== Sources ==
- Tim Tivoli Steele, "School of the Pond Farm Workshops: An Artist's Refuge", in A Report, the San Francisco Craft and Folk Art Museum Journal, 10:2, 1992.
- Dean and Geraldine Schwarz, eds., Marguerite Wildenhain and the Bauhaus: An Eyewitness Anthology. Decorah, Iowa: South Bear Press, 2007. ISBN 978-0-9761381-2-9. Majors portions of this book provide historic documentation (text, interviews, maps and photographs) of the Herr family's Pond Farm Workshops and Marguerite Wildenhain's Pond Farm Pottery.
