= Kunstgewerbeschule =

19th- and 20th-century art colleges

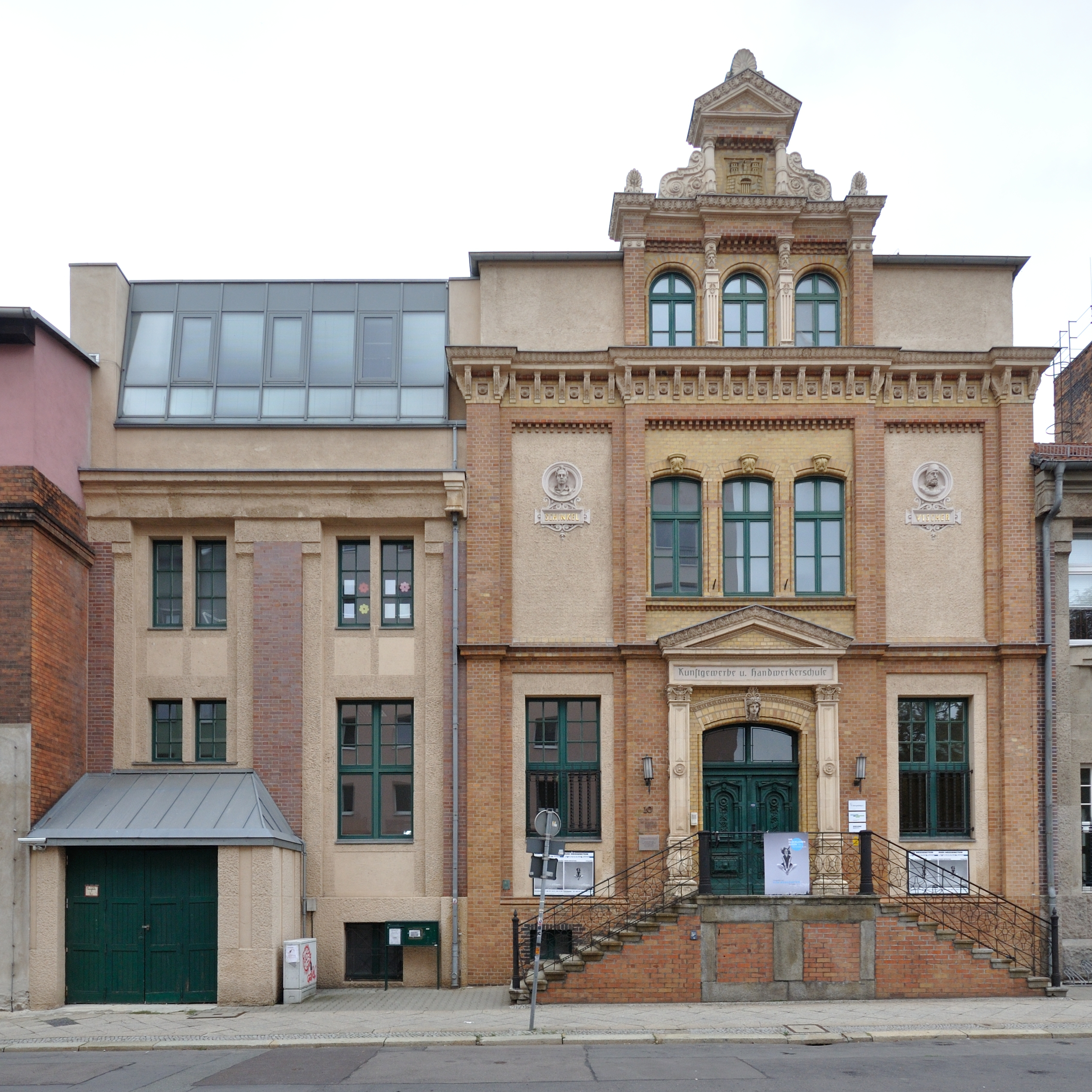
Kunstgewerbeschule Magdeburg building

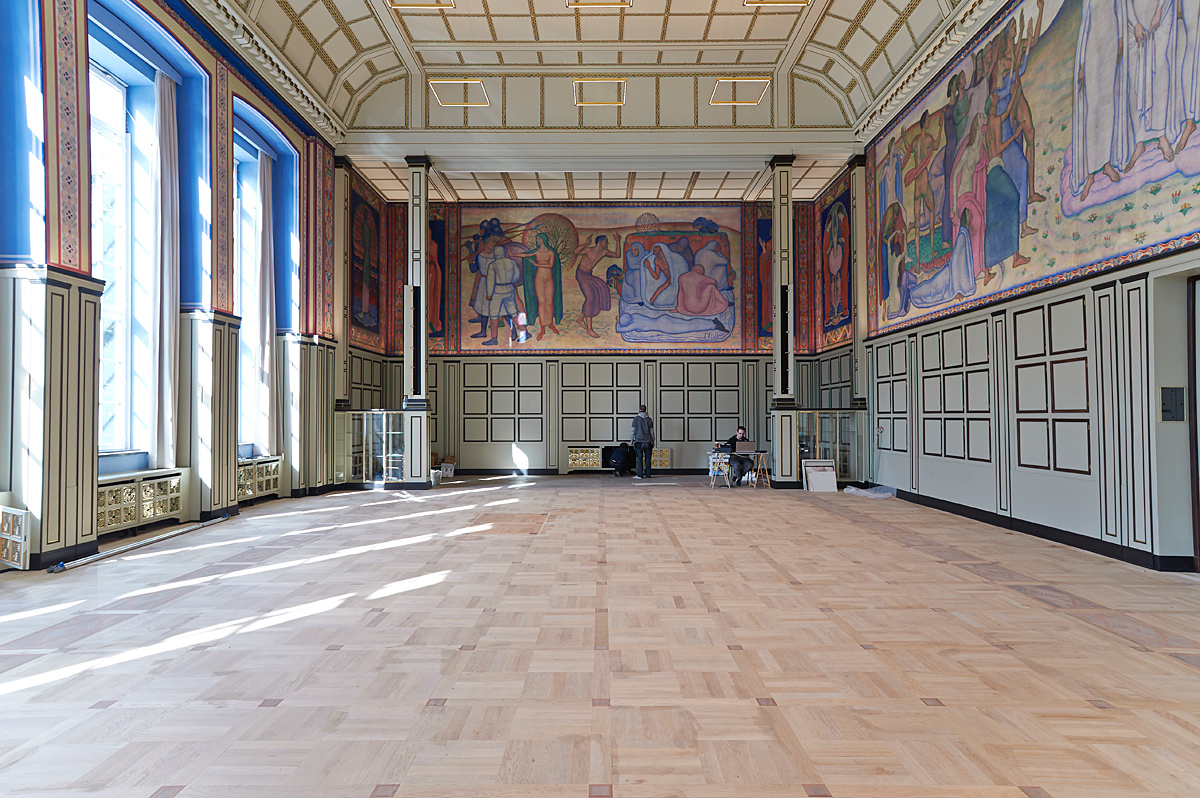
Auditorium of the former Kunstgewerbeschule Hamburg, with the mural de:Die ewige Welle by de:Willy von Beckerath, created 1911–1918, restored 2011

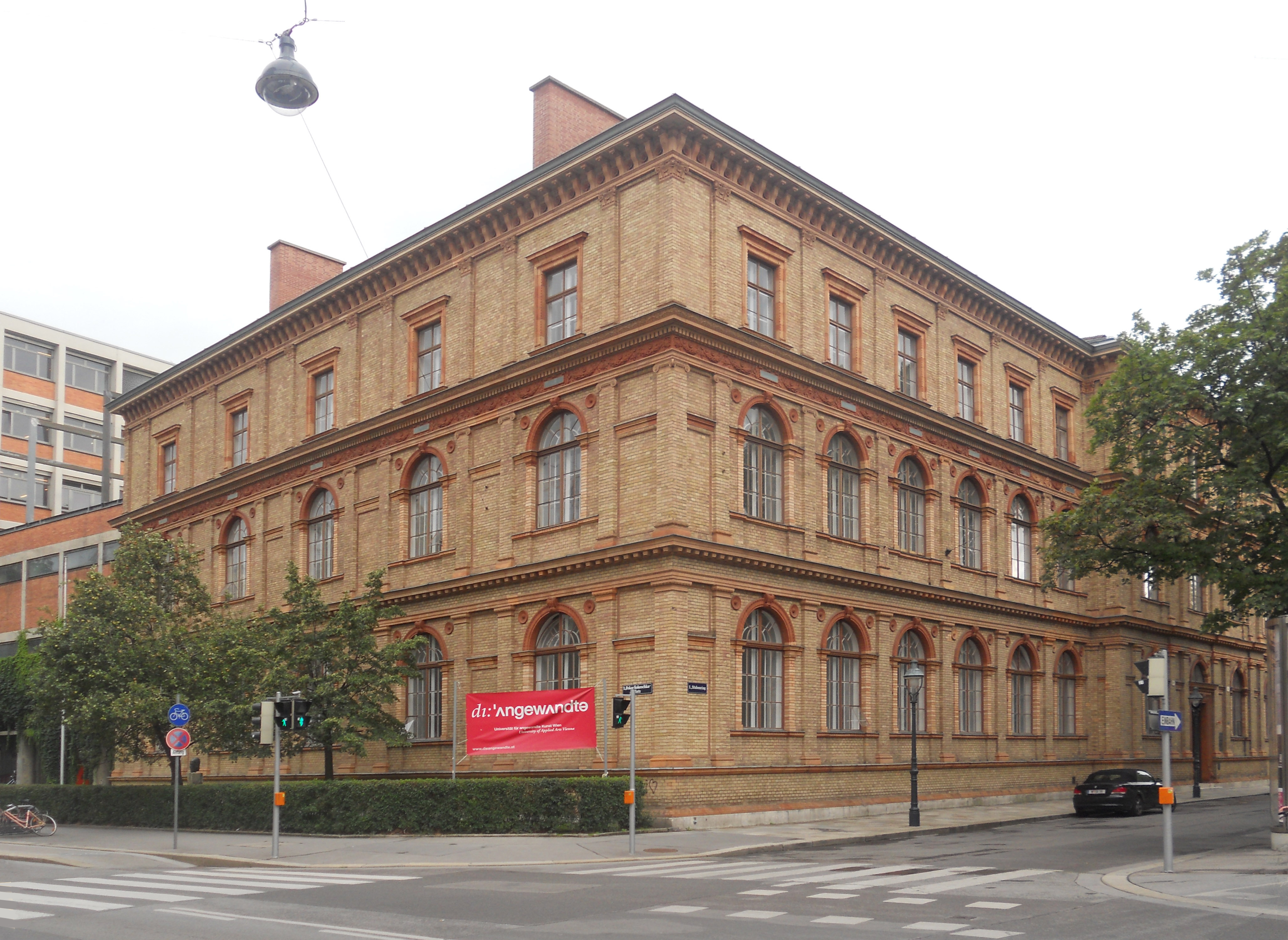
Building of the former Kunstgewerbeschule Vienna, now the University of Applied Arts Vienna

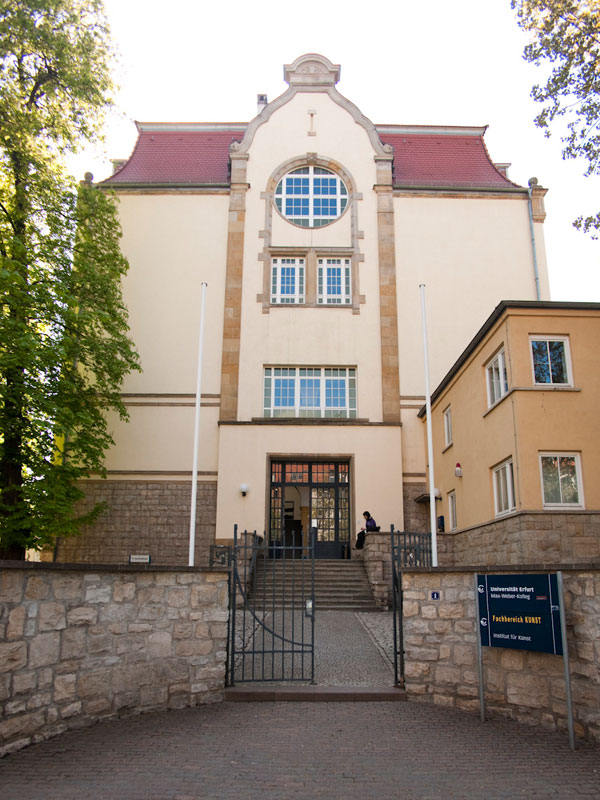
Entrance to the former Kunstgewerbeschule Erfurt, now the Art and Music building of the Education Faculty, University of Erfurt

A Kunstgewerbeschule (English: School of Arts and Crafts or School of Applied Arts) was a type of vocational arts school that existed in German-speaking countries from the mid-19th century. The term Werkkunstschule was also used for these schools. From the 1920s and after World War II, most of them either merged into universities or closed, although some continued until the 1970s.

Students generally started at these schools from the ages of 16 to 20 years old, although sometimes as young as 14, and undertook a four-year course, in which they were given a general education and also learnt specific arts and craft skills such as weaving, metalwork, painting, sculpting, etc.

Some of the most well known artists of the period had been Kunstgewerbeschule students, including Anni Albers, Peter Behrens, René Burri, Otto Dix, Karl Duldig, Horst P. Horst, Gustav Klimt, Oskar Kokoschka, Egon Schiele and Oskar Schlemmer. Many students accepted into the renowned Bauhaus art school had previously studied at Kunstgewerbeschulen.

== List of Kunstgewerbeschulen (selected) ==
In order of date opened:

- Wien (Vienna) (1867). The Kunstgewerbeschule Wien became a higher education institute in 1941, and became the University of Applied Arts Vienna in 1999. Its main building was designed in 1877. The school was closely affiliated with the Imperial Royal Austrian Museum of Art and Industry, now the Museum of Applied Arts, Vienna, known as MAK, which was founded in 1863. Notable alumni of the Kunstgewerbeschule include Gustav Klimt and Oskar Kokoschka and Lucie Rie.
- Berlin (1868). Berlin had two Kunstgewerbeschulen. The teaching institute of the Berlin Museum of Applied Arts (German: de:Unterrichtsanstalt des Kunstgewerbemuseums Berlin), opened on 12 January 1868. The museum itself was founded in 1866 as an initiative of a private museum association. The school was set up to provide an alternative to academic arts training. From 1881 the school was based in the museum's Martin-Gropius-Bau building in Niederkirchnerstraße in Kreuzberg. In 1885 the Prussian state took over the Kunstgewerbemuseum and its affiliated school. In 1924, the school was separated from the museum and merged with the Hochschule für die Bildenden Künste, to become the Vereinigten Staatsschulen für Freie und Angewandte Kunst (United state schools for free and applied arts). It is one of the predecessors of the Hochschule der Künste Berlin which was founded in 1975, and which since 2001 has been the Universität der Künste Berlin (UdK) (Berlin University of the Arts). The other Berlin Kunstgewerbeschule, founded in 1899, was also integrated into what is now UdK, see below. The Reimann School in Berlin, founded in 1902, was also a vocational arts school, but it was privately funded, rather than being a state-funded Kunstgewerbeschule.
- München (Munich) (1868) The Königliche Kunstgewerbeschule München (Royal school of arts and crafts) was renamed the Staatsschule für angewandte Kunst (State school for applied art) in 1928, and in 1937 renamed again as the Akademie für angewandte Kunst. In 1946 it was incorporated into the Akademie der Bildenden Künste München (Academy of Fine Arts, Munich).
- Kassel (1869). The school grew from an art academy founded in 1777 and was established as the Werkkunstschule on 24 May 1869. It closed at the beginning of World War II and its premises were used as a military hospital, which stopped operating in May 1943 due to flood damage caused by the bombing of the Edersee Dam, of the Dam Busters fame. The school reopened under the name Schule für Handwerk und Kunst (School for Crafts and Art) in 1946. After various name changes and changes of premises this merged into the Kunsthochschule Kassel in 1970, which, in 1971, became a faculty of the University of Kassel.
- Stuttgart (1869). The school was called the Württembergische staatliche Kunstgewerbeschule (Württemberg state school of applied arts). In 1946 it became the Staatliche Akademie der Bildenden Künste Stuttgart (State Academy of Fine Arts Stuttgart).
- Kaiserslautern (1874). The school was founded as the Pfälzische kunstgewerbliche Fachschule (Palatinate school of arts and crafts) in 1874, along with the Königliche Kreisbaugewerkschule (Royal district building trades school). About 1938 both schools merged to become the present day Meisterschule für Handwerker Kaiserslautern (Master school for trades people).
- Dresden (1875). It was founded as the Königlich-Sächsische Kunstgewerbeschule (Royal Saxon School of Applied Arts). It became the Akademie für Kunstgewerbe (State Academy of Applied Arts) in 1921, and merged with the Dresden Academy of Fine Arts in 1950 to become the present day Hochschule für Bildende Künste Dresden.
- Leipzig (1876). The Königliche Kunstakademie und Kunstgewerbeschule was established in 1876, from the earlier Zeichnungs-, Malerey- und Architectur-Academie which was founded in 1764. The writer Johann Wolfgang Goethe, then a law student, started attending drawing classes there from Autumn 1765. From 1900 the school was called the Königliche Akademie für graphische Künste und Buchgewerbe (Royal school for art and the book trade). After World War II, in 1947, it became the Akademie für Graphik und Buchkunst – staatliche Kunsthochschule, and in 1950 the Hochschule für Graphik und Buchkunst (Academy for graphic design and book art). Today it is known as the Hochschule für Grafik und Buchkunst / Academy of Fine Arts Leipzig (HGB) (de).
- Breslau (Polish: Wrocław) (1876). The Königlichen Kunst und Kunstgewerbeschule Breslau (Royal art and crafts school), founded in 1876 in what was then Prussia. It had its origins in the provincial art school, Provinzialkunstschule, founded in 1791. This became the Königlichen Kunst- Bau- und Handwerkerschule (Royal art, building and crafts school) in 1816. From 1911 it was the de:Staatliche Akademie für Kunst und Kunstgewerbe Breslau. It was closed on 1 April 1932 in the wake of an emergency decree issued under Article 48 of the Weimar Constitution. A new art school, now called the Eugeniusz Geppert Academy of Fine Arts in English, was established in Wrocław in March 1946.
- Pforzheim (1877). The school was founded as the Herzoglichen Kunstgewerbeschule und Fachschule für die Metallindustrie (Ducal School of Arts and Crafts and School for the Metal Industry). It merged into the Staatlichen Höheren Wirtschaftsfachschule, a tertiary institute for economics founded in 1963, a predecessor of the Hochschule Pforzheim, a business, design and engineering institution.
- Karlsruhe (1878). The Kunstgewerbeschule Karlsruhe, established 1878, merged with the Großherzoglichen Badischen Kunstschule Karlsruhe (Grand Ducal School of Painting Karlsruhe) in 1920, to create the Badische Landeskunstschule (Baden state art school). This closed in 1944, and reopen in 1947 as the Badischen Akademie der bildenden Künste (Baden Academy of Fine Arts). Since 1961 it has been the State Academy of Fine Arts Karlsruhe.
- Frankfurt am Main (1878). Founded in 1878, in about 1930 the Kunstgewerbeschule Frankfurt was integrated into the Städelschule, an art school which had its origins in the Städel Art Institute which had been established in Frankfurt in 1817. The school is now known as the Staatliche Hochschule für Bildende Künste – Städelschule.
- Zürich (1878). Along with a number of other institutions, the Kunstgewerbeschule Zurich is a predecessor of the Zurich University of the Arts (German:Zürcher Hochschule der Künste – ZHdK).
- Nürnberg (Nuremberg) (1883). The present day Akademie der Bildenden Künste Nürnberg (AdBK) (Academy of Fine Arts, Nuremberg), originated from a painting academy founded in 1662, making it the oldest art school in the German speaking world. In 1820 it was renamed the Königliche Kunstschule (Royal Art School). Due to government pressure to develop trade and commerce in Nuremberg, in 1883 it became the Kunst- und Kunstgewerbeschule, focusing solely on applied arts rather than fine art. It became the Staatsschule für angewandte Kunst (State school for applied art) in 1928, and in 1940 it got its current name.
- Düsseldorf (1883). The Kunstgewerbeschule Düsseldorf was opened on 3 April 1883. It closed at the end of the school year in 1918. In 1919 its architectural courses were transferred to the Kunstakademie Düsseldorf.
- Magdeburg (1887). The Magdeburg school developed from a drawing school founded on 6 October 1793. It became the de:Kunstgewerbe- und Handwerkerschule Magdeburg on 9 October 1887. It closed in 1963.
- Hamburg (1896). The Kunstgewerbeschule Hamburg was renamed the Landeskunstschule (State Art School) in 1928, and became the Hochschule für bildende Künste Hamburg (University of Fine Arts Hamburg) in 1955.
- Erfurt (1898). The school was officially called de:Staatlich-Städtischen Handwerker-und Kunstgewerbeschule. It was informally known as the Hügelschule, because it is in a street called Am Hügel ('On the hill'). It became the Fachschule für angewandte Kunst (College for applied art) in 1946. From 1955 it was part of Erfurt teachers' training college and since 2001 it has been the art and music building of the University of Erfurt Education Faculty.

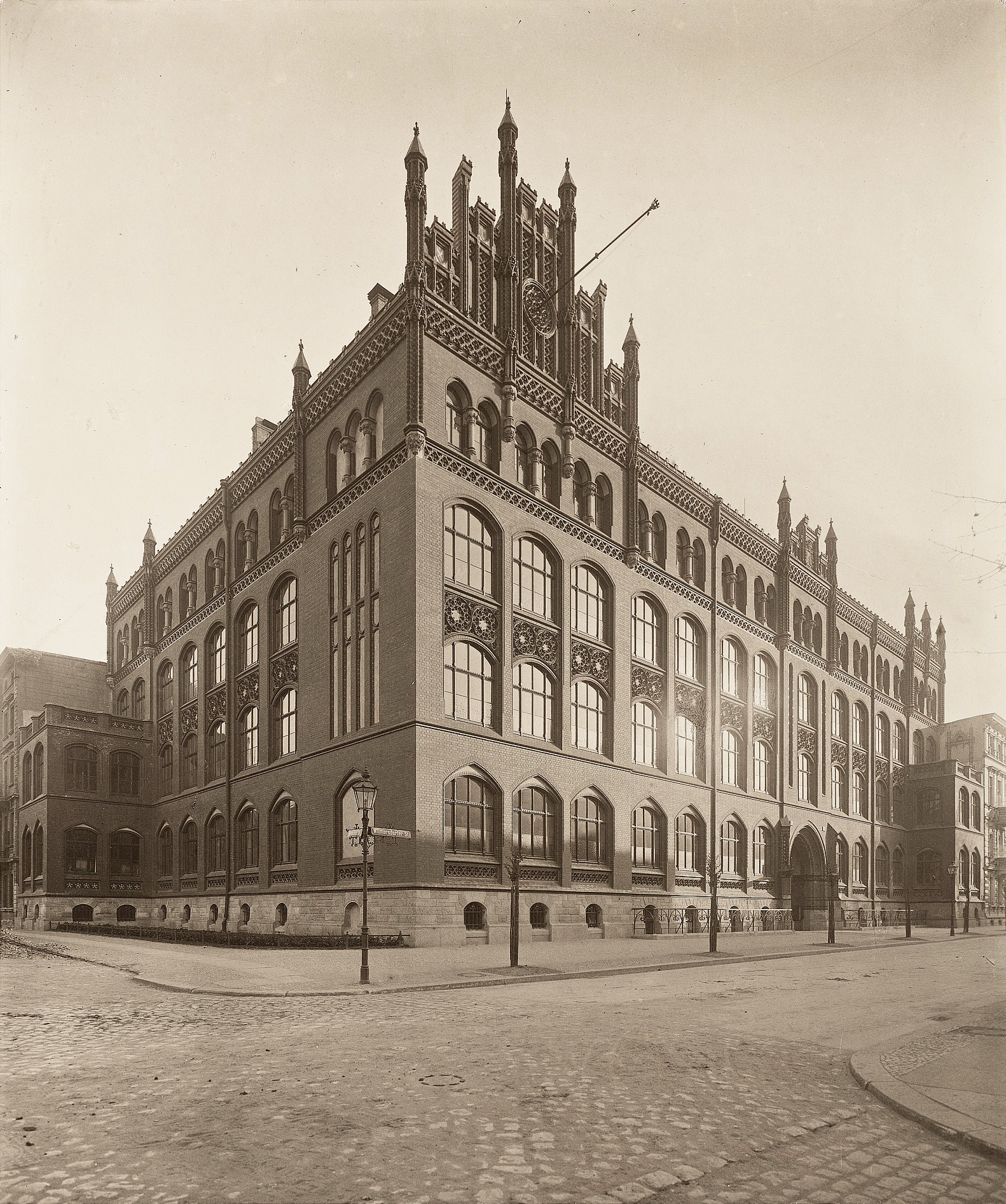
Kunstgewerbe und Handwerkerschule, in Berlin-Charlottenburg, c. 1900

- Berlin (1899) The second of the two applied arts schools in Berlin had its origins in a continuing education school set up in 1861 for young tradesmen. In 1899 it was established as the Kunstgewerbe- und Handwerkerschule (de) (Applied arts and tradesmen's school). From 1900 until 1943 it was based in Eosanderstraße in Charlottenburg. In November 1943 the building was destroyed in an air raid.

During the Nazi period, in 1936, the school was renamed the Meisterschule des deutschen Handwerks der Reichshauptstadt (Master school of German trades of the imperial capital city). After the war it was again renamed as the Meisterschule für das Kunsthandwerk (Master school for arts and crafts). In 1952 it moved into a building on what is now the Straße des 17. Juni, which now belongs to the Berlin University of the Arts. In 1964 the art school was called the Staatliche Werkkunstschule, and from 1966 the Staatliche Akademie für Werkkunst und Mode (State academy for applied arts and fashion). In 1971, it was integrated into the Hochschule für Bildende Künste. In 1975, this became the Hochschule der Künste Berlin, which since 2001 has been the Universität der Künste Berlin (UdK) (Berlin University of the Arts).

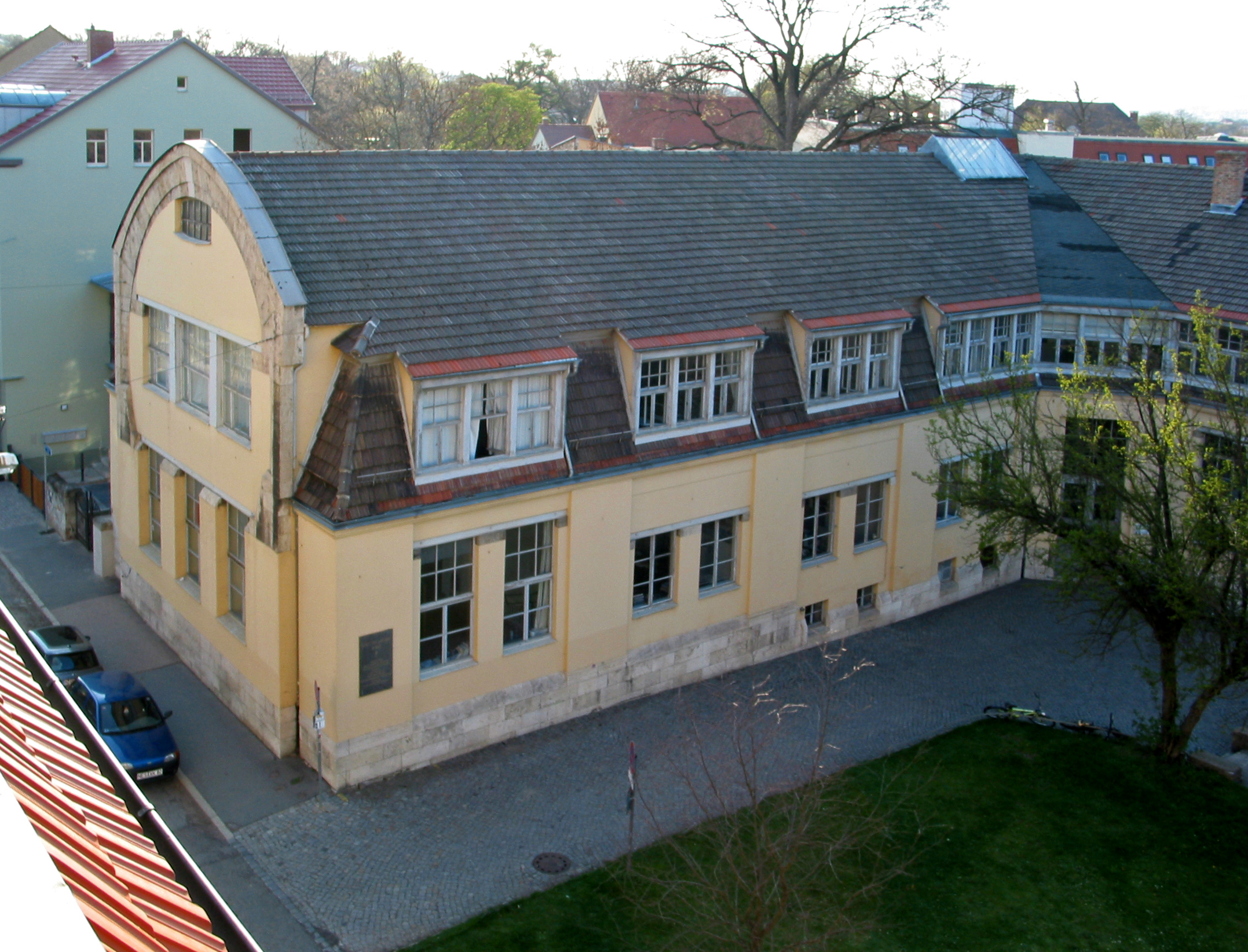
Weimar Kunstgewerbeschule building, which was later used by the Bauhaus from 1919 to 1925

- Weimar (1908). Officially called the de:Großherzoglich-Sächsische Kunstgewerbeschule Weimar (Grand-Ducal Saxon School of Arts and Crafts, Weimar), the school was founded following the formation of the Kunstgewerbliche Institut, Weimar in 1905. The school closed in 1915 following the departure of its Belgian director, Henry van de Velde, due to political pressure, as Germany and Belgium were on opposing sides in the First World War (1914–1918).

A separate school, on a neighbouring site, the Großherzoglich-Sächsische Kunstschule Weimar (Grand-Ducal Saxon Art School, Weimar), was founded in 1860 and 1910 it became a higher education institute named the Großherzoglich Sächsische Hochschule für Bildende Kunst (Grand-Ducal Saxon School for Fine Arts).

In 1919 the buildings used by the former Kunstgewerbeschule and the neighbouring Hochschule für Bildende Kunst became the base of the newly founded Bauhaus art school. The buildings, designed by Henry van de Velde between 1904 and 1911, are now part of the Bauhaus World Heritage Site.

The Bauhaus moved from Weimar to Dessau in 1925. The buildings in Weimar were used by successor arts related educational institutions. There were also other art schools, at other sites, in Weimar, including the Fürstliche freie Zeichenschule Weimar (Weimar Princely Free Drawing School), which existed from 1776 to 1930, and the Staatliche Bauschule Weimar (State Architecture / Building Trades School). After various mergers, restructurings and renamings, the present day Bauhaus-Universität Weimar, founded in 1996 after German reunification, operates on the former Bauhaus site, teaching art and design related courses.

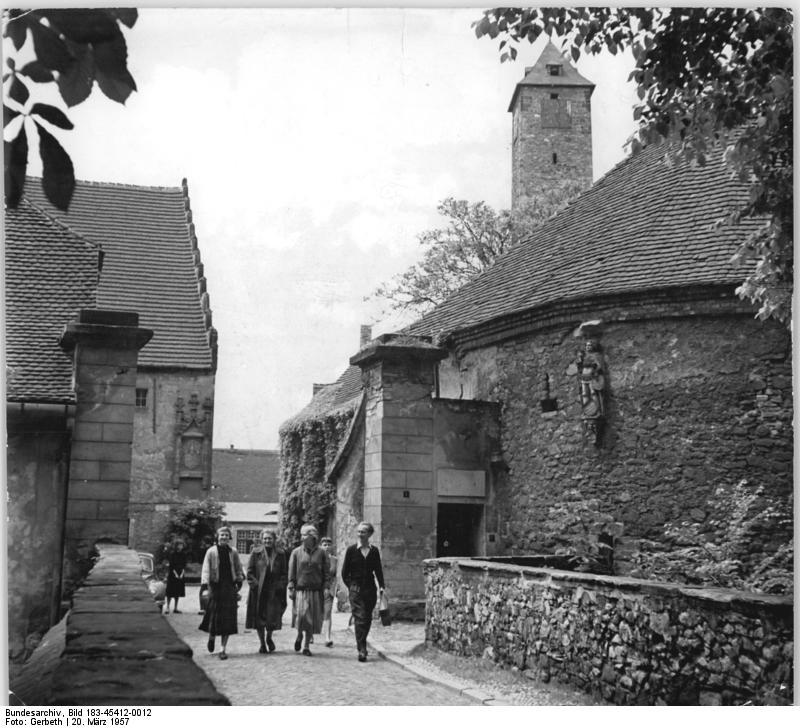
Burg Giebichenstein Kunsthochschule Halle in 1957, then called the Institut für künstlerische Werkgestaltung

- Halle (Saale) (1915) The school was established as the Handwerkerschule der Stadt Halle in 1915, following the merger of the Provinzial-Gewerbeschule (the trades school of the region), founded in 1852, and the Gewerblicher Zeichenschule (a technical drawing school), founded in 1870. It was renamed the Handwerker- und Kunstgewerbeschule in 1918. In 1921–22 the school moved into the lower castle (German: Unterburg) of Burg Giebichenstein, after which it was called the Werkstätten der Stadt Halle, Staatliche-stadtische Kunstgewerbeschule Burg Giebichenstein (Workshops of the City of Halle, Burg Giebichenstein State and City School of Applied Arts).

Quite a number of former students and teachers from the Bauhaus went to work at the school, including: Gerhard Marcks, the Rector from 1928 to 1933; Hans Wittwer, who ran the Architecture department; Benita Koch-Otte, who ran the weaving workshop; Marguerite Friedländer and Erich Consemüller. When the Nazis came to power in 1933, these people and other staff considered to be avant-garde were dismissed. The Painting, Graphic Design, Sculpture, Architecture, Photography and Carpentry workshops were all closed. In 1938 it was renamed the Meisterschule des Deutschen Handwerks auf Burg Giebichenstein Halle-Saale, Werkstätten der Stadt Halle (Master school of German Trades at Burg Giebichenstein Halle-Saale). "Meisterschule" was a term used by the Nazis; after World War II the school had a number of name changes. In 2011 it became the Burg Giebichenstein Kunsthochschule Halle (Burg Giebichenstein University of Art and Design).

- Wiesbaden (1919). The Handwerker- und Kunstgewerbeschule Wiesbaden grew from a continuing education school established in 1817. From 1844 that school was supported by the trades association of the Duchy of Nassau, the Gewerbeverein für Nassau. By 1881 it had three departments offering lessons in commerce, drawing and model making. In 1918 the city of Wiesbaden took over the school, and in 1919 it was established as the Handwerker- und Kunstgewerbeschule. The same year the school moved into a building built in 1863 for a primary school, which was designed by the architect Philipp Hoffmann. The building now houses the Kunsthaus Wiesbaden, the city art gallery. The school closed in 1934. It reopened in 1947 and was renamed as the Werkkunstschule Wiesbaden in 1949. In 1971 it merged with the engineering colleges in Geisenheim, Idstein and Rüsselsheim to form the Fachhochschule Wiesbaden, which since 2013 has been called the RheinMain University of Applied Sciences.

== See also ==
- Art school
- Hochschule
- Volkshochschule
