= Marguerite Wildenhain =

American ceramic artist, educator and author

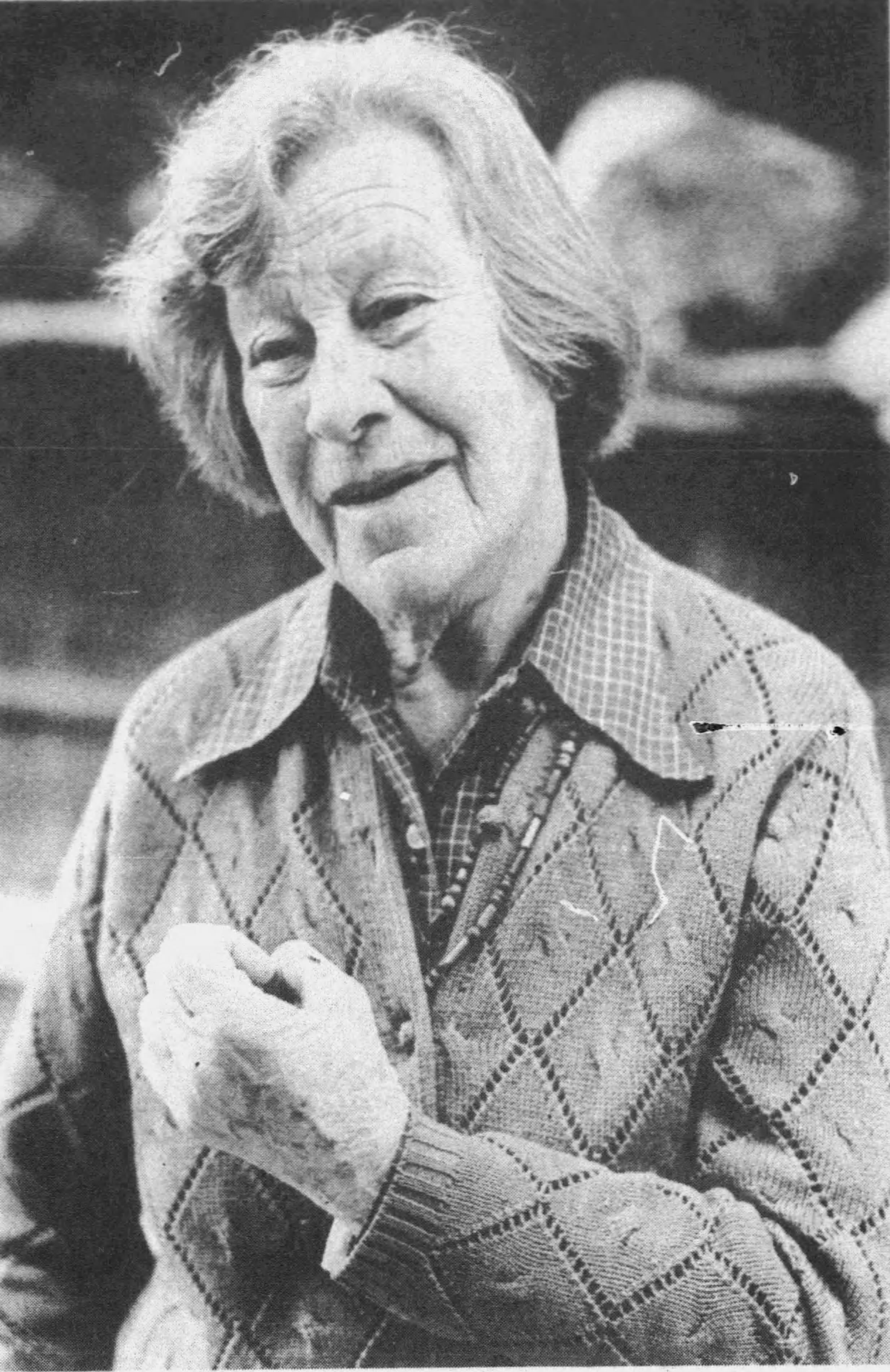
- Wildenhain in 1978
- Born: Marguerite Friedlaender; October 11, 1896; Lyon, France
- Died: February 24, 1985 (aged 88); Guerneville, California, U.S.
- Other names: Marguerite Friedländer, Marguerite Wildenhain-Friedlander
- Education: Berlin University of the Arts, Bauhaus
- Years active: 1914–1980
- Parents: Théodore Friedlaender (father); Rose Calmann (mother)
- Relatives: Henri Friedlaender (brother)

Marguerite Wildenhain, née Marguerite Friedlaender, also spelled Friedländer (October 11, 1896 – February 24, 1985), was an American Bauhaus-trained ceramic artist, educator and author. After immigrating to the United States in 1940, she taught at Pond Farm and wrote three influential books: Pottery: Form and Expression (1959), The Invisible Core: A Potter's Life and Thoughts (1973), and That We Look and See: An Admirer Looks at the Indians (1979). Artist Robert Arneson described her as "the grande dame of potters,".

== Early life ==
Wildenhain was born on October 11, 1896, in Lyon, France, to a British mother, Rose Calmann and a German father, Théodore Friedlaender, who was a silk merchant. Her brother was the Israeli typographer Henri Friedlaender. She received a primary education first in Germany, then in Yorkshire, England. At the start of World War I, her family moved to Germany where she completed secondary school.

Beginning in 1914, she studied sculpture at the Berlin University of the Arts, then worked as a decorator of porcelain ware at a factory in Rudolstadt. It was at that factory where her passion for the potter's wheel ignited. When she was not working at the factory, she explored the countryside. Shortly after World War I, while in Weimar for a weekend, she happened upon the posted proclamation by architect Walter Gropius about the founding of the Bauhaus school in 1919: ""a new guild of craftsmen without the class distinctions which raise an arrogant barrier between craftsmen and artists". Then and there, as she recalled in her autobiography, she decided to become one of the first students to enroll. Wildenhain attended Bauhaus in Dornburg from 1919 to 1925.

== Bauhaus and after, 1919–1940 ==
During her time at Bauhaus, Wildenhain studied alongside painters Paul Klee and Wassily Kandinsky and she worked closely with sculptor Gerhard Marcks (her Formmeister or Form Master) and potter Max Krehan (her Lehrmeister or Crafts Master). In 1925, Wildenhain became the first woman to earn the Master Potter certification in Germany.

In 1926, she left the school and moved to Halle-Saale, Germany, where she was appointed head of the ceramics workshop at the Burg Giebichenstein University of Art and Design. While there, she also became associated with Konigliche Porzellan-Manufaktur (or KPM), now Staatliche Porzellan-Manufaktur, for which she designed the prototypes for elegant, mass-produced dinnerware, most notably the Halle tea set and the Burg-Giebichenstein dinner service (both in 1930). The same year, she married a younger ceramic artist named Frans or Franz Wildenhain (1905–80), who had earlier been her classmate at the Weimar Bauhaus and served as her apprentice at Burg Giebichenstein.

When the Nazis came to power in 1933, Wildenhain was forced to leave her teaching post because of her Jewish ancestry. With her husband (a non-Jewish German citizen), she moved to Putten, Netherlands, where the couple established a pottery shop called Het Kruikje (The Little Jug), and where, until 1940, they lived by making pottery. In advance of the Nazi invasion, Wildenhain was able to leave Holland in 1940 and to emigrate to New York, but her husband's concurrent request was denied.

== Pond Farm, 1949–1952 ==
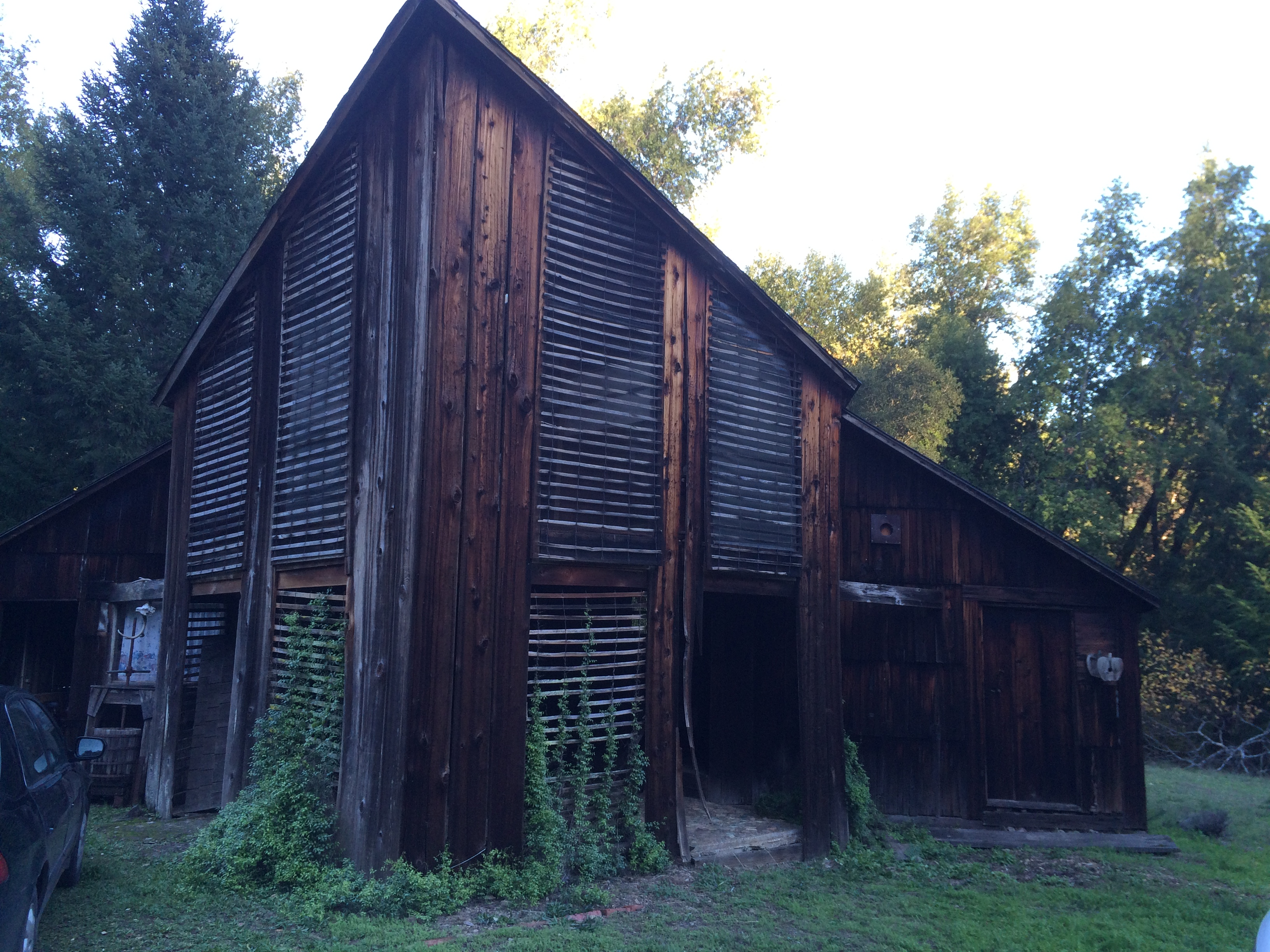
Pond Farm Barn, Guerneville, California

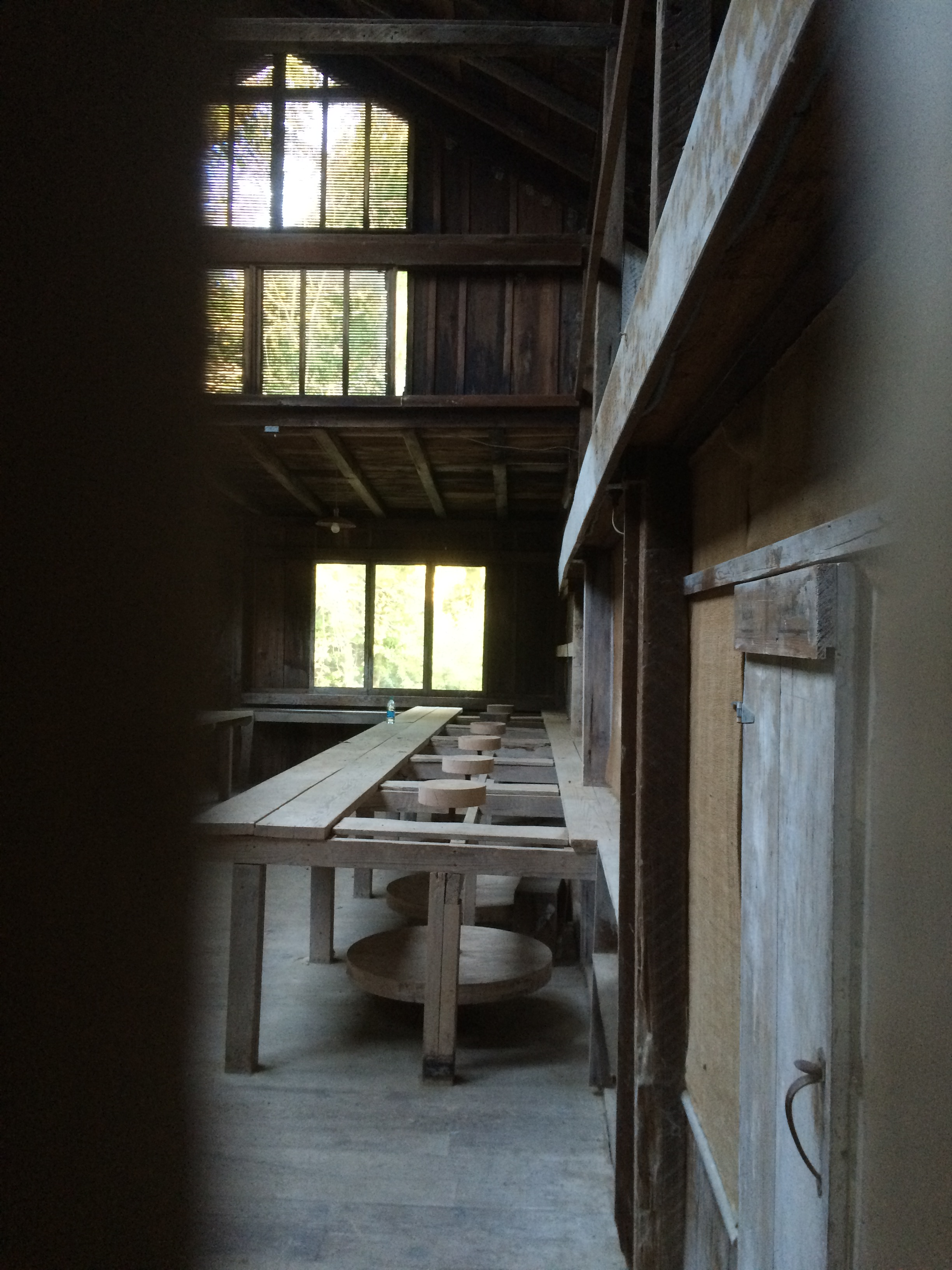
Pond Farm Interior showing one of two sets of potter's wheels

Wildenhain moved from New York to California on May 27, 1940, where she held a teaching position for two years at the California College of Arts and Crafts (now the California College of the Arts) in Oakland. In the early 1940s, Wildenhain relocated to Pond Farm, a tract of farmland owned by architect Gordon Herr and his wife Jane Herr, where she focused on creating the workshop it would become. After gaining U.S. citizenship in 1945, Wildenhain was able to fund and to sponsor the emigration of her husband (who, in the years of their separation, had been drafted into the German army).

The Pond Farm Workshops, as they became known, ran from 1949 to 1952 and were run by Gordon Herr, Marguerite and Franz Wildenhain, and two other artist colleagues, textile artist Trude Guermonprez (born Jalowetz) and metals artist Victor Ries. Collage artist Jean Varda and sculptor Claire Falkenstein also taught at Pond Farm once per week. In these demanding workshops, focused on using the Bauhaus-style kick wheel, students created hundreds of ceramic forms such as flower pots, bowls, pitchers, cups, and tea pots. During the workshops, the students focused on the mastery of process rather than the glazing and firing of wares. During breaks, students and teachers discussed topics such as nature and music, philosophy, leaf structure, and bookkeeping. The Pond Farm truly functioned as a "school for life". Many of her students went on to become successful professional ceramicists, and credit Wildenhain with monumental growth in their artistic careers.

The Pond Farm Workshops eventually ended for a number of reasons: Herr's dominant leadership style, disregarded requests for communal ownership by the artists, Jane Herr's 1952 death from cancer, and more. Franz also left Marguerite and took a faculty position in the School For American Craftsmen at the Rochester Institute of Technology in New York, while Marguerite continued to live at Pond Farm. Wildenhain continued to teach until 1979.

== 1952 Seminar at Black Mountain College ==
Wildenhain was the featured lecturer and demonstrator at the Pottery seminar at Black Mountain College in 1952 that influenced many younger potters who attended.

== Later years and death, 1952–1985 ==
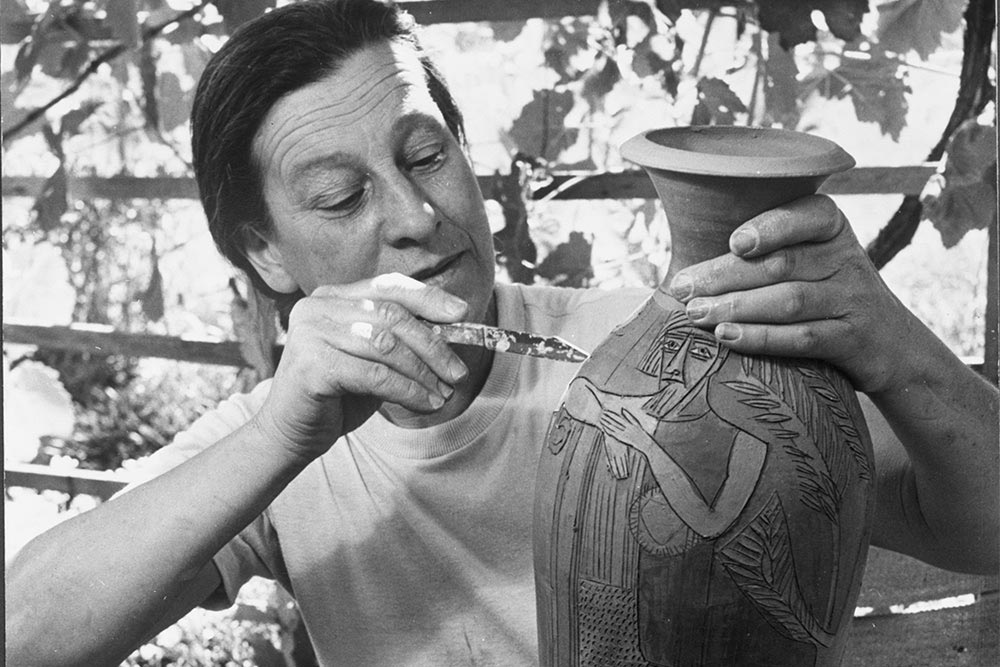
Wildenhain decorating a pot c. 1962

In the years that followed, as Marguerite Wildenhain's artistic stature grew, she continued to operate her own summer school, accepting twenty or more students each year. She also published three books (Pottery: Form and Expression; The Invisible Core: A Potter's Life and Thoughts; and That We Look and See: An Admirer Looks at the Indians), lectured at schools throughout the U.S., and took solo expeditions to South and Central America, Europe, and the Middle East.

She died at age 88 on February 24, 1985, in Guerneville, California.

== Legacy ==
Since her death, the grounds and buildings at Pond Farm have been preserved, and are now officially a part of the California State Parks system.

Pond farm and the Austin Creek Recreational Area were taken over in 2012 by an operating agreement between "Stewards of the Coast and Redwoods" and the State Parks. Shortly after Stewards took on the responsibility of keeping this State Park open, Pond Farm was designated a "National Treasure" by the National Trust for Historic Preservation, and with this status, plans are moving forward to restore and preserve the studio and home. Ultimately Pond Farm will be accessible for public use in some appropriate form, yet to be determined.

== Iconography ==
- Charles Crodel: Die Töpferin Marguerite Friedlaender, Berliner Sezession, 64. Ausstellung: Künstler unter sich. Malerei. Plastik. April / März 1931, Nr. 9 (Veröffentlichungen des Kunstdienstes Nr. 57)

== Writings ==
- Pottery, Form and Expression (New York, 1962)
- The Invisible Core: A Potter's Life and Thoughts (New York, 1973)
- ...that We Look and See: An Admirer Looks at the Indians (Decorah, IA, 1979)
- R. Kath, ed.: The Letters of Gerhard Marcks and Marguerite Wildenhain, 1970–1981: A Mingling of Souls. (Ames, IA, 1991).
- D.L. Schwarz, ed.: Marguerite Letters to Franz Wildenhain (Decorah, IA, 2005).

== See also ==
- Dean Schwarz
- Women of the Bauhaus

== Bibliography ==
- E. Levin, "Wildenhain, Marguerite (1896–1985)" in J.Heller and N. G. Heller(eds.), North American Women Artists of the Twentieth Century: A Biographical Dictionary. (New York, 1995).
- R.R. Behrens, "My Bauhaus Connection" in Print. July/August. (New York, 1996), pp. 24 and 233–234.
- R.R. Behrens, Recalling Pond Farm: My Memory Shards of a Summer with Bauhaus Potter Marguerite Wildenhain (Dysart, IA: 2005).
- Robert V. Fullerton Art Museum, Ripples: Marguerite Wildenhain and Her Pond Farm Students. Exhibition catalog. (San Bernardino, CA, 2002).
- Dean and Geraldine Schwarz, eds., Marguerite Wildenhain and the Bauhaus: An Eyewitness Anthology. (Decorah, IA: South Bear Press, 2007). ISBN 978-0-9761381-2-9.
- Dean and Geraldine Schwarz, Centering Bauhaus Clay: A Potter's Perspective. Decorah, Iowa: South Bear Press, 2009. ISBN 978-0-9761381-5-0.
- Bruce A. Austin, Frans Wildenhain 1950–75: Creative and Commercial American Ceramics at Mid-Century. Rochester, NY: Printing Applications Lab, 2012. ISBN 978-0-615-64527-8
- Museum & Schools Program Educator Guide Kindergarten to Grade 12: Marguerite Wildenhain: Bauhaus to Pond Farm . Santa Rosa, CA: Sonoma County Museum, 2007.
