= Gerhard Marcks =

German sculptor (1889–1981)

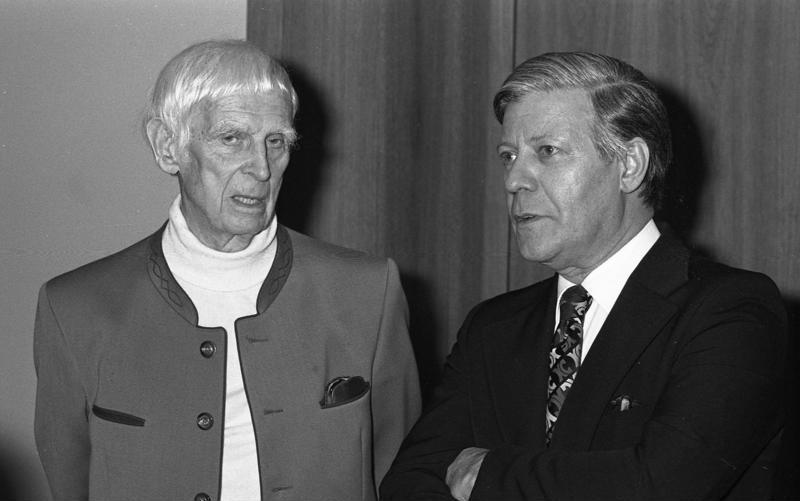
- Marcks (left) with Helmut Schmidt
- Born: 18 February 1889; Berlin, German Empire
- Died: 13 November 1981 (aged 92); Burgbrohl, West Germany

Gerhard Marcks (18 February 1889 – 13 November 1981) was a German artist, known primarily as a sculptor, but who is also known for his drawings, woodcuts, lithographs and ceramics.

== Early life ==
Marcks was born in Berlin, where, at the age of 18, he worked as an apprentice to sculptor Richard Scheibe. In 1914, he married Maria Schmidtlein, with whom he would raise six children. During World War I, he served in the German army, which resulted in long-term health problems.

With architect Walter Gropius, German-American painter Lyonel Feininger, Scheibe and others, Marcks was a member of two art-related political groups, the Novembergruppe (November Group) and the Arbeitsrat für Kunst (Working Council for Art). He was also affiliated with the Deutscher Werkbund, of which Gropius was a founding member.

== Bauhaus master ==
In 1919, when Gropius founded the Bauhaus, in Weimar, Marcks was one of the first three faculty members to be hired, along with Feininger and Johannes Itten. Specifically, Marcks was appointed the Formmeister (Form Master) of the school's Pottery Workshop, which was located not in Weimar but in an annex to the school in nearby Dornburg. The other teacher in that workshop, its Lehrmeister (Crafts Master) was Master Potter Max Krehan, the last of a long line of potters, whose workshop was in Dornburg. Krehan taught the students to throw pots on the wheel, to trim and glaze them, and to fire the kiln. Marcks, in addition to duties in Weimar, taught the history of the practice, encouraged experimentation, and sometimes decorated pots.

Earlier, Marcks had made the models for a series of animal sculptures, which were reproduced in China by a porcelain factory. His interest in animal forms is reflected in the work he made for his first Bauhaus portfolio (Neue Europaeische Graphik I), such as Die Katzen ("The Cats") and Die Eule ("The Owl"), both woodcuts. In time, his focus shifted to the human figure, and it was this subject that continued to hold his attention for the rest of his life.

== Further career ==
In September 1925, the Bauhaus was relocated to Dessau, and its pottery workshop was discontinued. Marcks moved instead to the Kunstgewerbeschule (School of Applied Arts) in Burg Giebichenstein near Halle. After the death of its director, Paul Thiersch, Marcks was named his replacement, a position he continued in until 1933. He was fired because his work was deemed unsuitable by the Nazis, with the result that several works were in the infamous exhibition of "degenerate art" in Munich in 1937, along with that of other Bauhaus artists, among them Herbert Bayer, Lyonel Feininger, Johannes Itten, Wassily Kandinsky, Paul Klee, László Moholy-Nagy, Oskar Schlemmer and Lothar Schreyer.

Despite such persecution, Marcks continued to live in the German city of Mecklenburg throughout World War II. In 1937, when twenty-four of his works were confiscated and destroyed by the Nazis, he was prohibited from exhibiting and threatened with being forbidden to work. During this period, he made several trips to Italy, where he worked in the Villa Romana in Florence and the Villa Massimo in Rome. In 1943, his studio in Berlin was hit during an air raid, and many of his works destroyed.

After World War II, Marcks became Professor of Sculpture at the Landeskunstschule (Regional Art School) in Hamburg, where he taught for four years, before retiring to Cologne. He also designed memorials for soldiers and civilians who had died in the war, and his work was part of the art competitions at three Olympic Games.

== Death and legacy ==
Marcks died in 1981 in Burgbrohl, in the Eifel. A decade earlier, the Gerhard Marcks Haus, which houses a permanent exhibition of his artwork, was established in his honor in Bremen. In this museum are 12,000 of his sketches and preparatory drawings, 900 prints, and all his sculptures (about 350). In the U.S., there is a collection of Marcks' work (68 drawings, 65 prints and 9 nine bronze sculptures) at Luther College in Decorah, Iowa, most of which were given to that school by his former student and close associate, Marguerite Wildenhain. Of particular note is a monumental Marcks bronze statue titled Oedipus and Antigone (1960), which was installed there in 2000.

His niece, the caricaturist Marie Marcks (1922–2014) was called the Grande Dame of political caricature.

== Honors and exhibitions ==
- In 1914 Marcks participated in exhibitions of the Berlin Secession and the Deutscher Werkbund, after World War II at the Venice Biennale and the Documentas I (1955), II (1959) and III (1964) in Kassel.
- In 1949 the city of Frankfurt am Main awarded him the Goethe Plaque.
- In 1952 he was appointed a Knight of the Peace Class of the Order Pour le Mérite.
- In 1954 North Rhine-Westphalia awarded him its Grand Art Prize.
- In 1955 the city of Berlin awarded him its Art Prize.
- In 1962 the Academy of Fine Arts, Nuremberg, made him an honorary member
- In 1979 he was honored on his 90th birthday by exhibitions in Berlin, Bremen, Cologne and Nuremberg, as well as by the award of the Grand Cross of Merit of the Federal Republic of Germany.
- In 1980 the American Academy of Letters, New York, made him an honorary member, together with Max Ernst and Karlheinz Stockhausen.
- In 1991 10778 Marcks (1991 gn10), a minor planet (asteroid) was discovered on 9 April, and named in his honor.

== Gallery ==
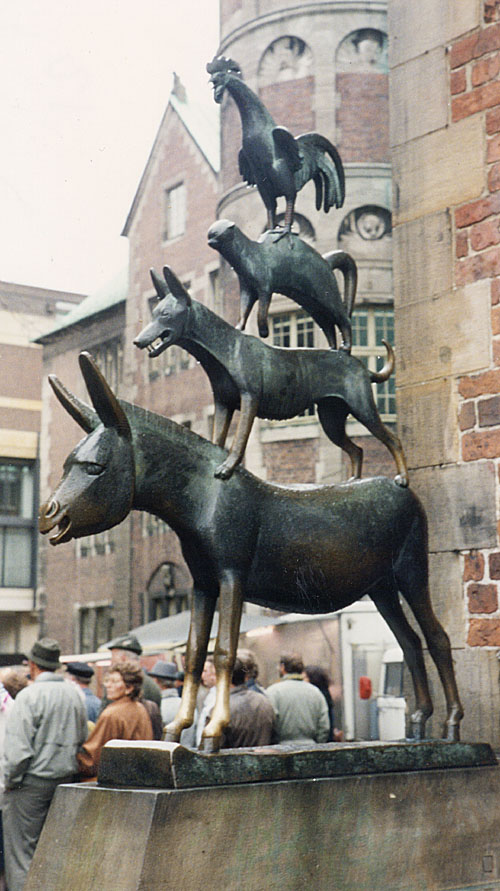
A bronze statue depicting the Bremen Town Musicians located in Bremen

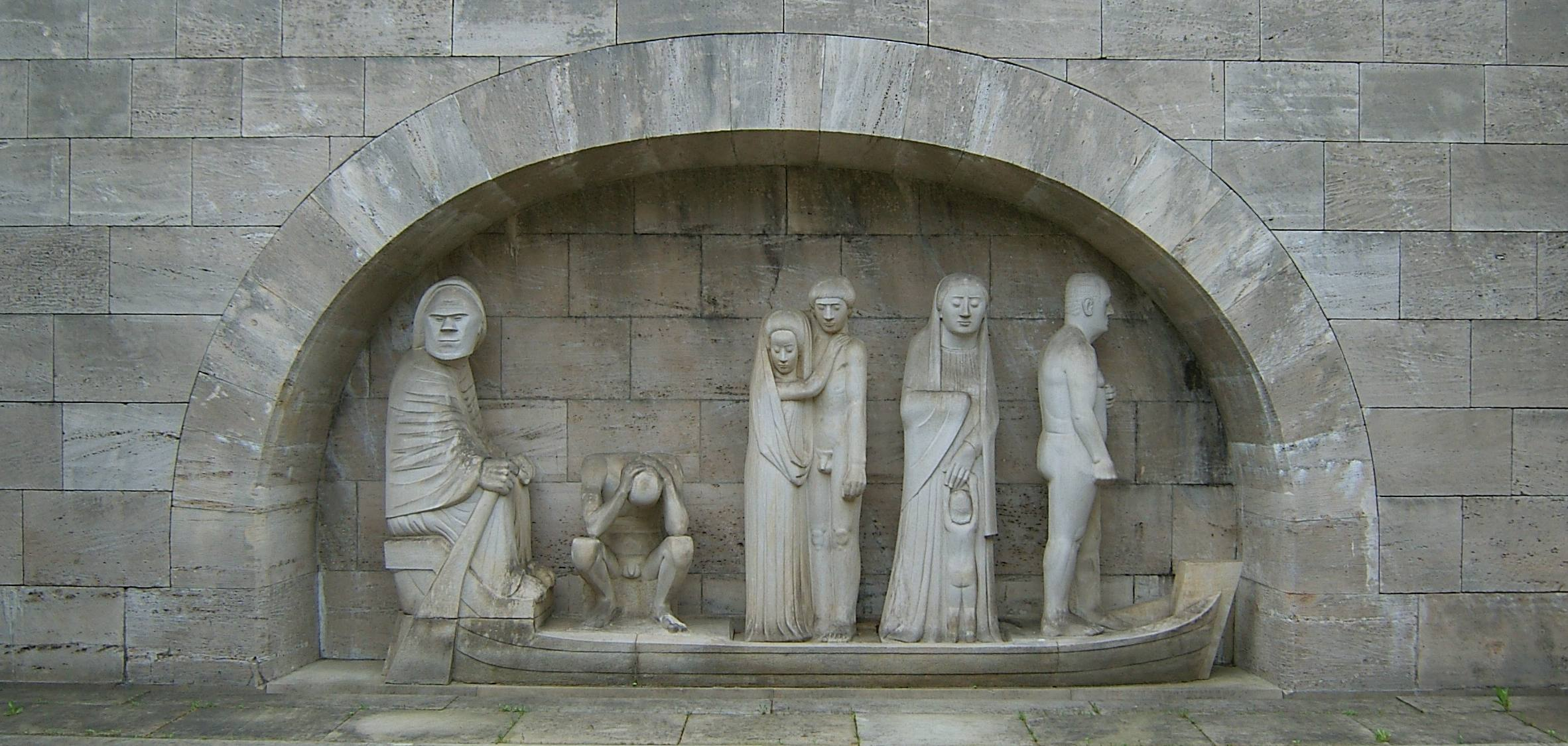
Hamburg, Ohlsdorf Cemetery, memorial for the victims of the aerial warfare

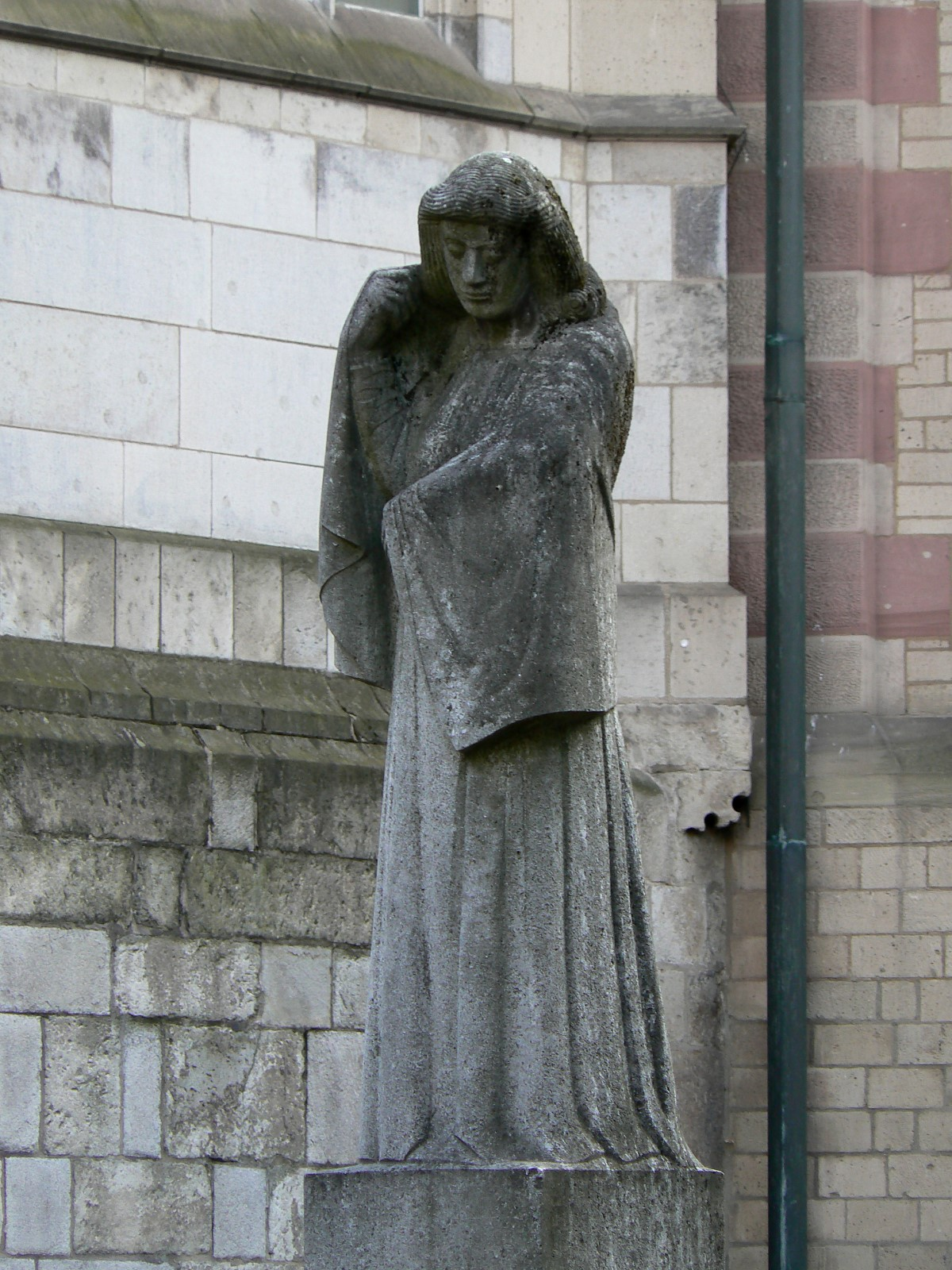
Die Trauernde / The Mourner in front of the St. Maria im Kapitol church in Cologne.

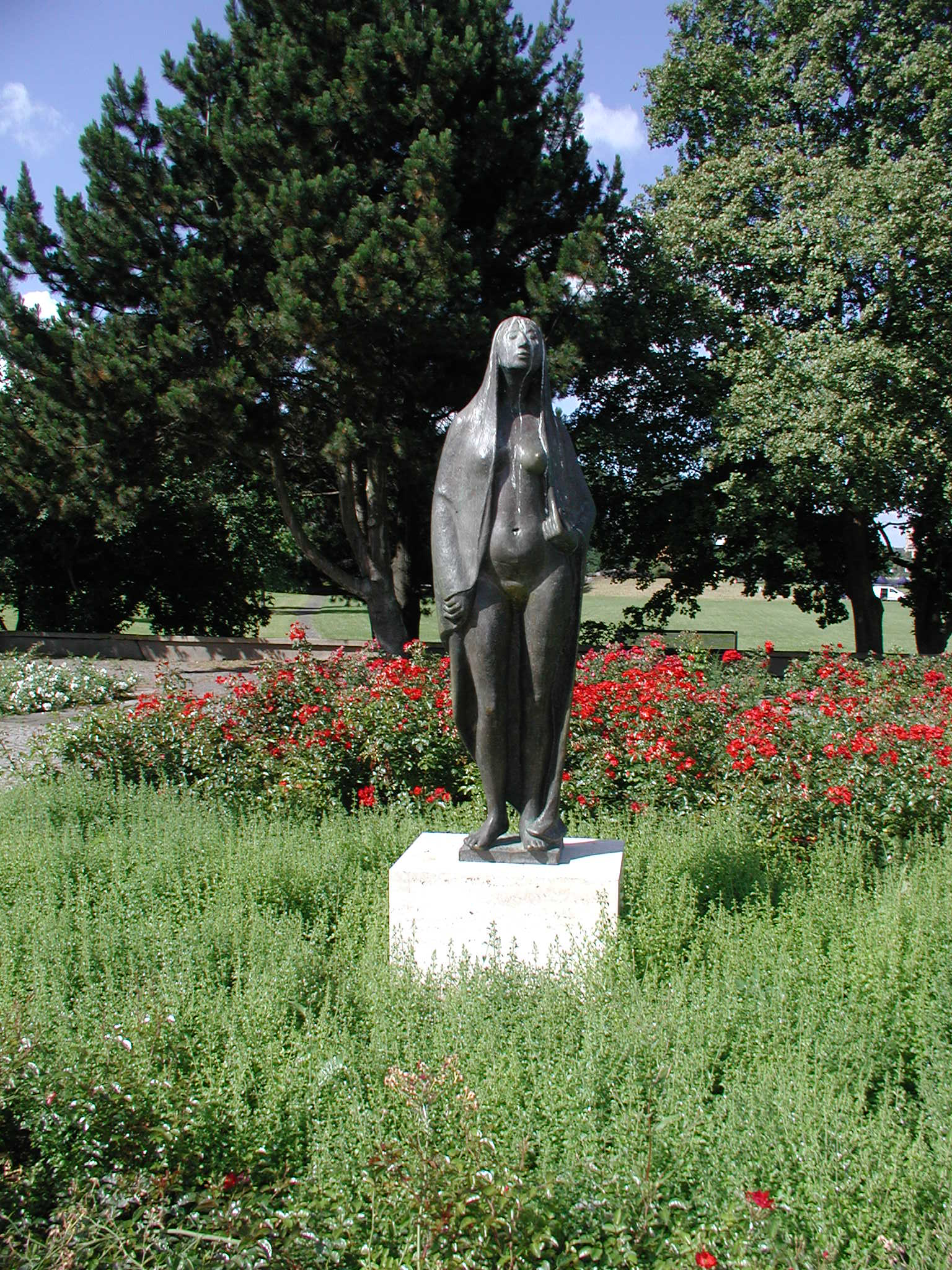
Gaea (1965), in the Rosengarten, Rheinpark, Cologne

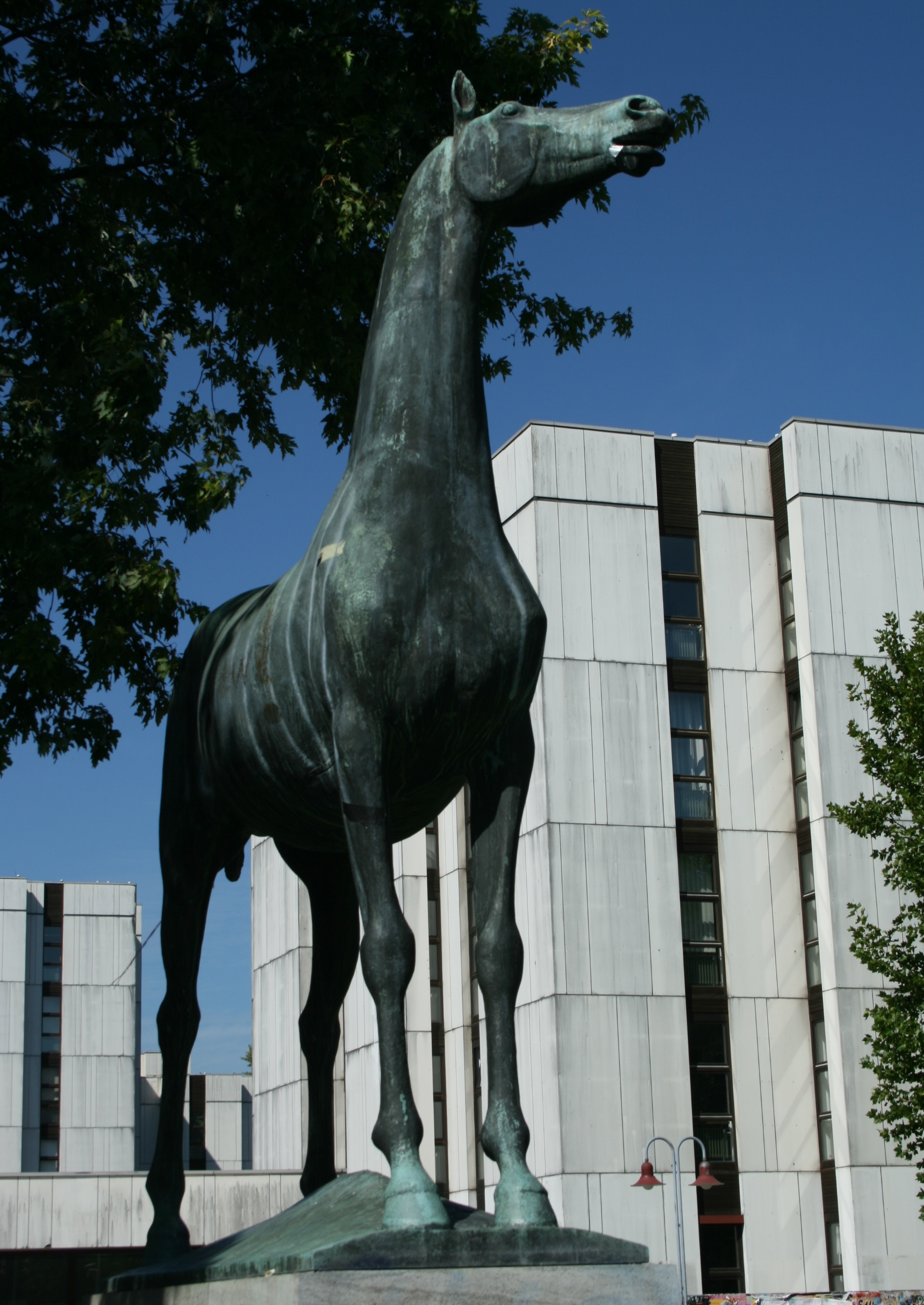
Der wiehernde Hengst / The Whinnying Stallion, second casting, 1974 (Note: On the Philosophikum campus of the Justus-Liebig-Universität Gießen (the first casting, 1961, is in front of the Stadttheater in Aachen))

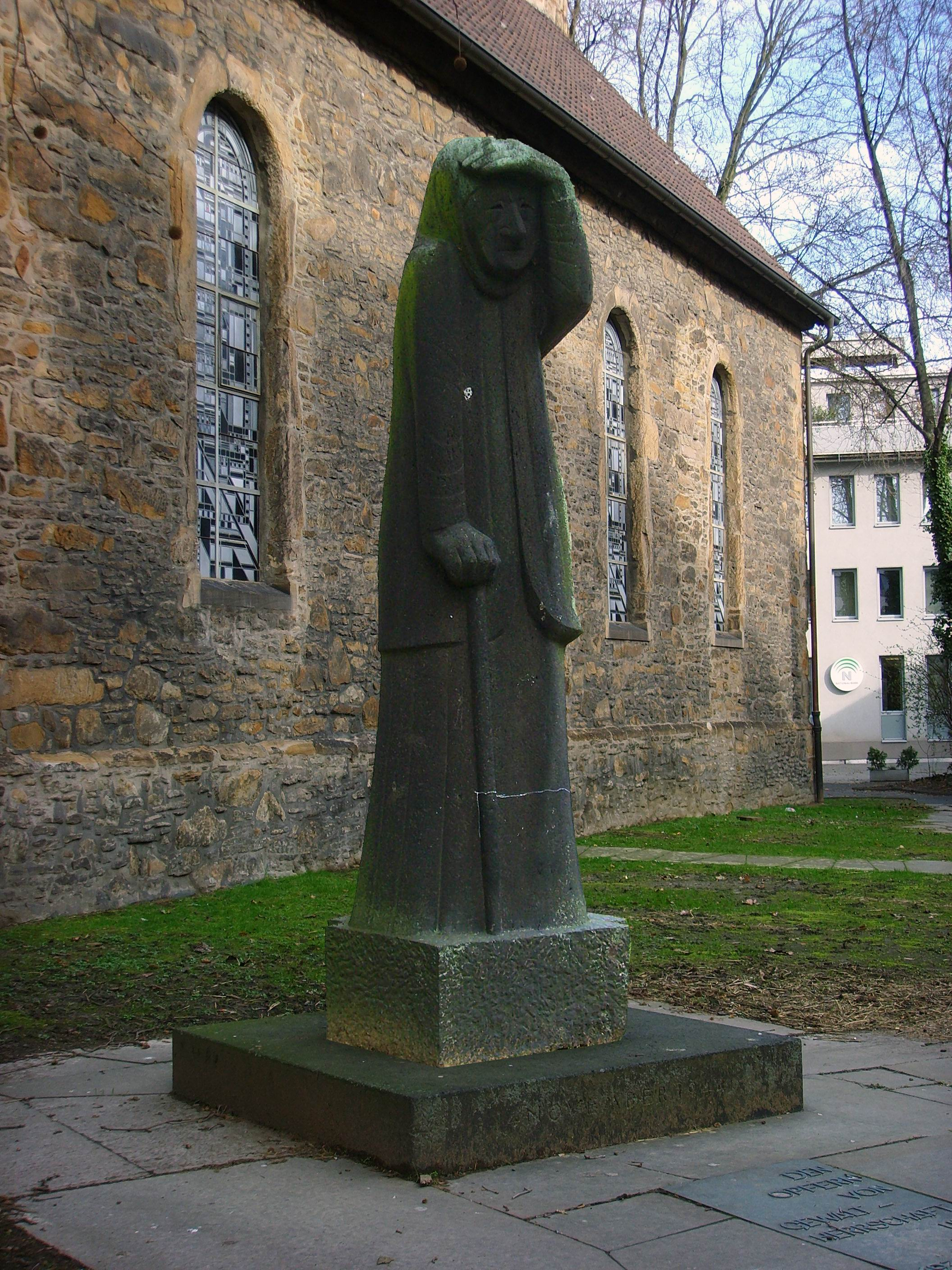
"The mourner old Woman" (1955), Bochum

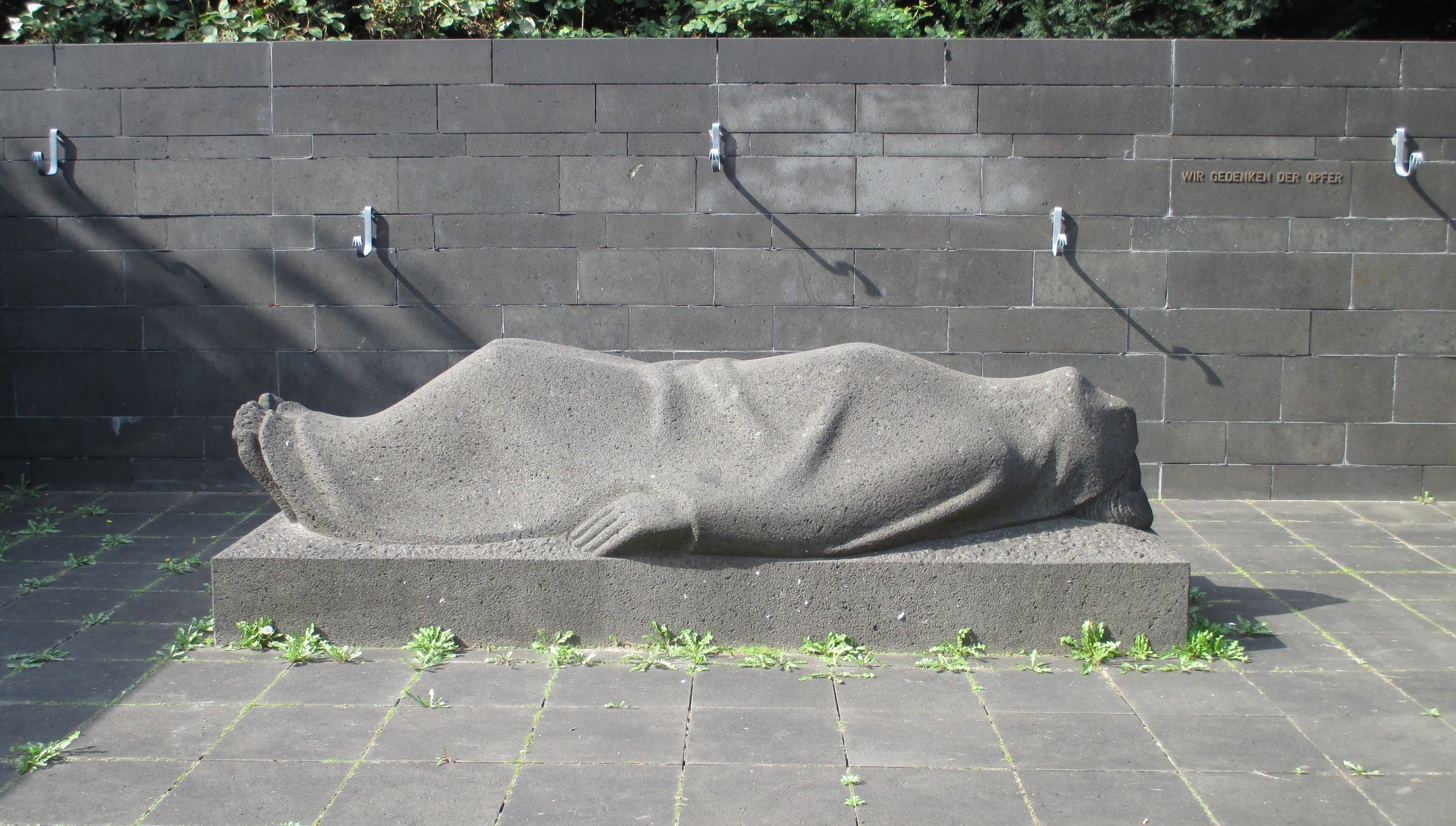
Memorial, 1968, Mülheim an der Ruhr

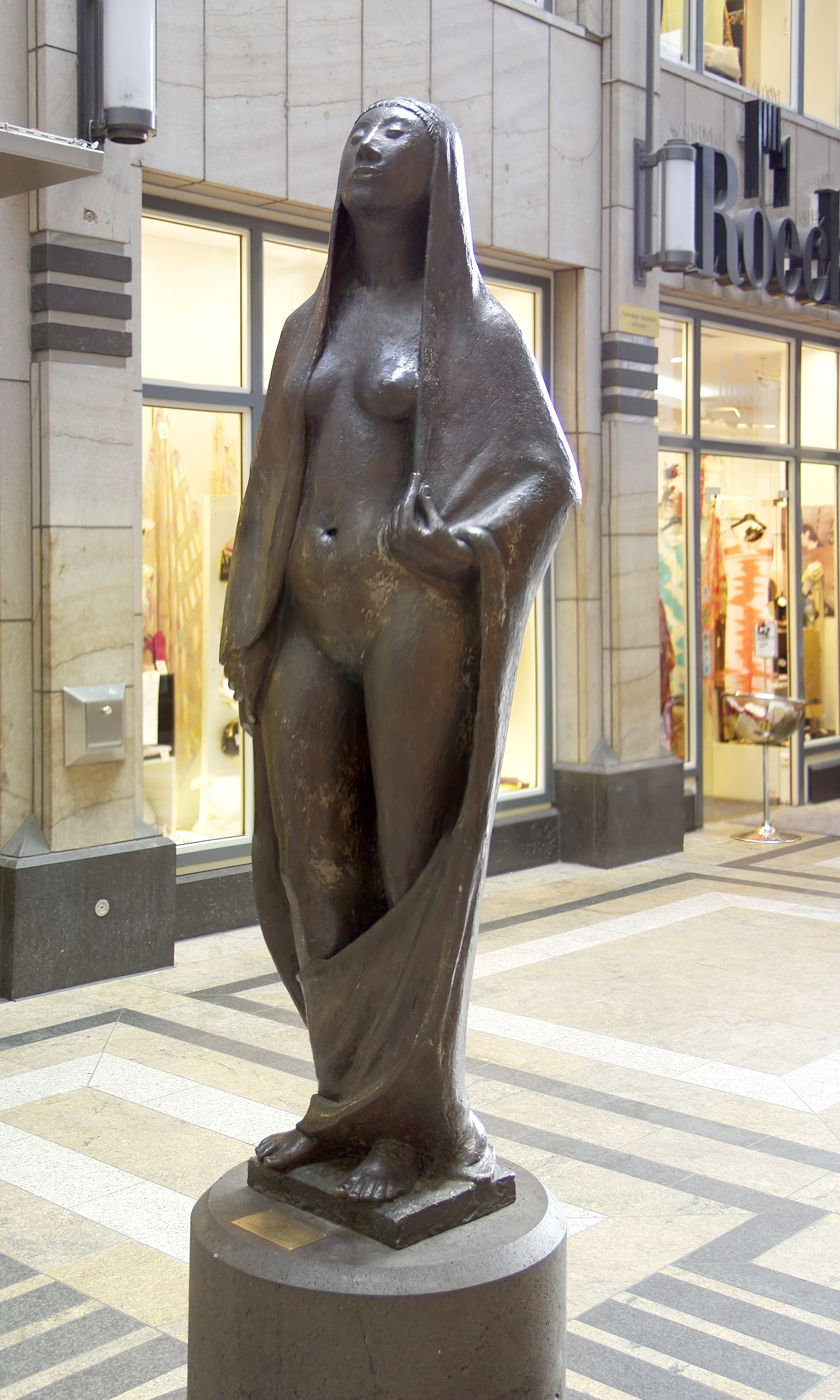
Stollwerkpassage, 1965,Cologne

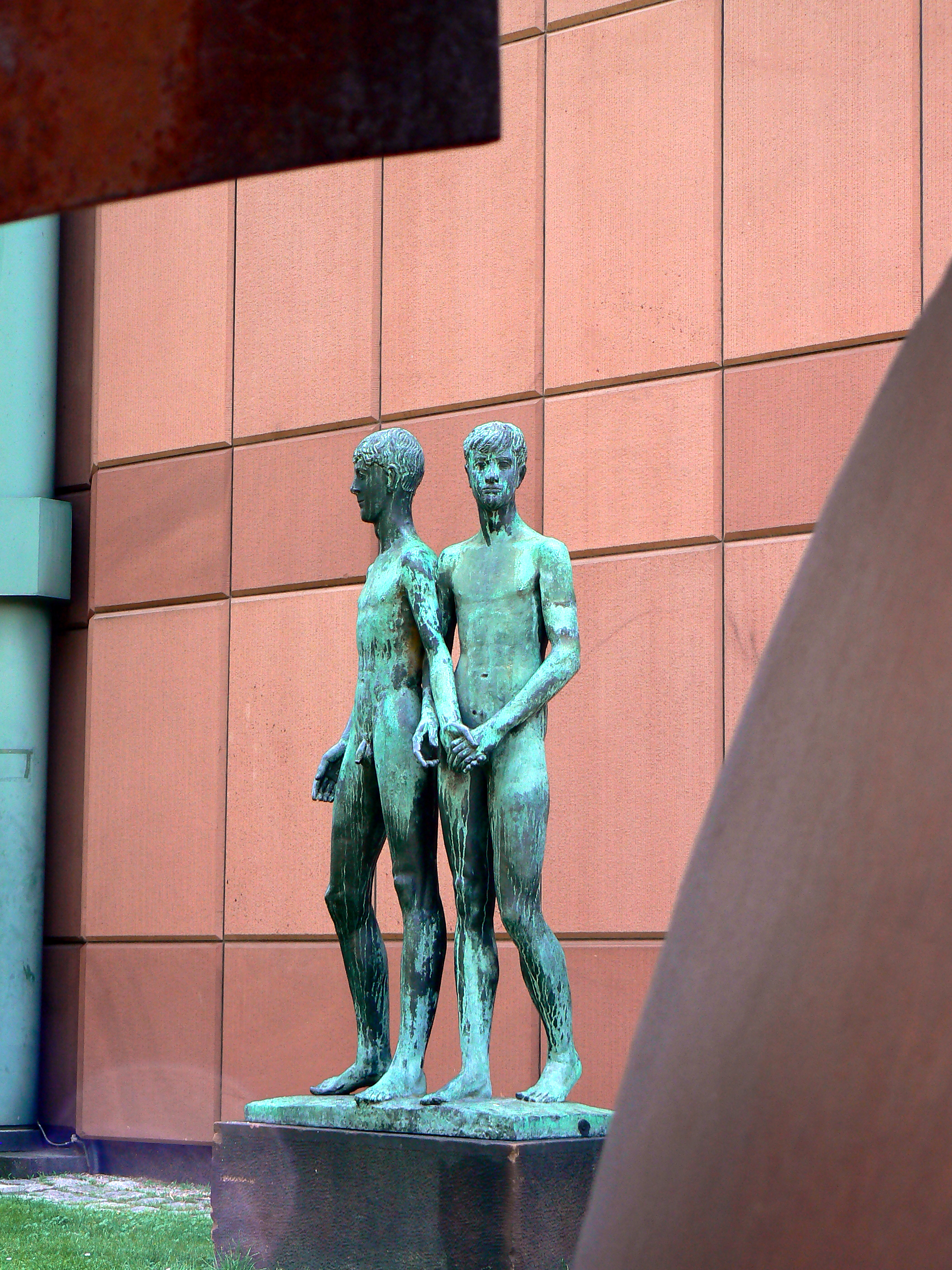
Two Friends (Konradin and Friedrich), Bronze, 1936

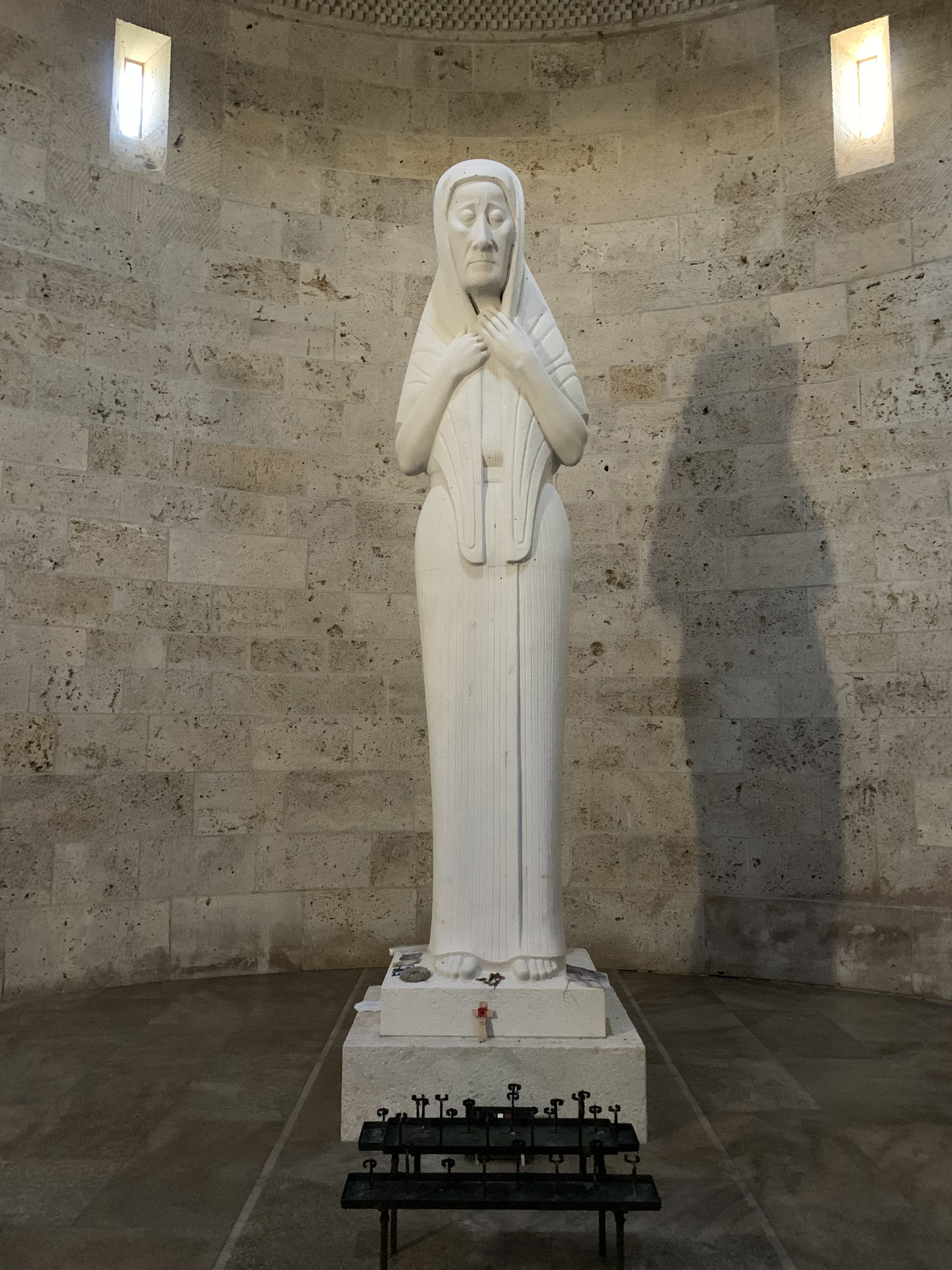
Sculpture at the Bourdon German war cemetery, Die Mutter [The Mother]

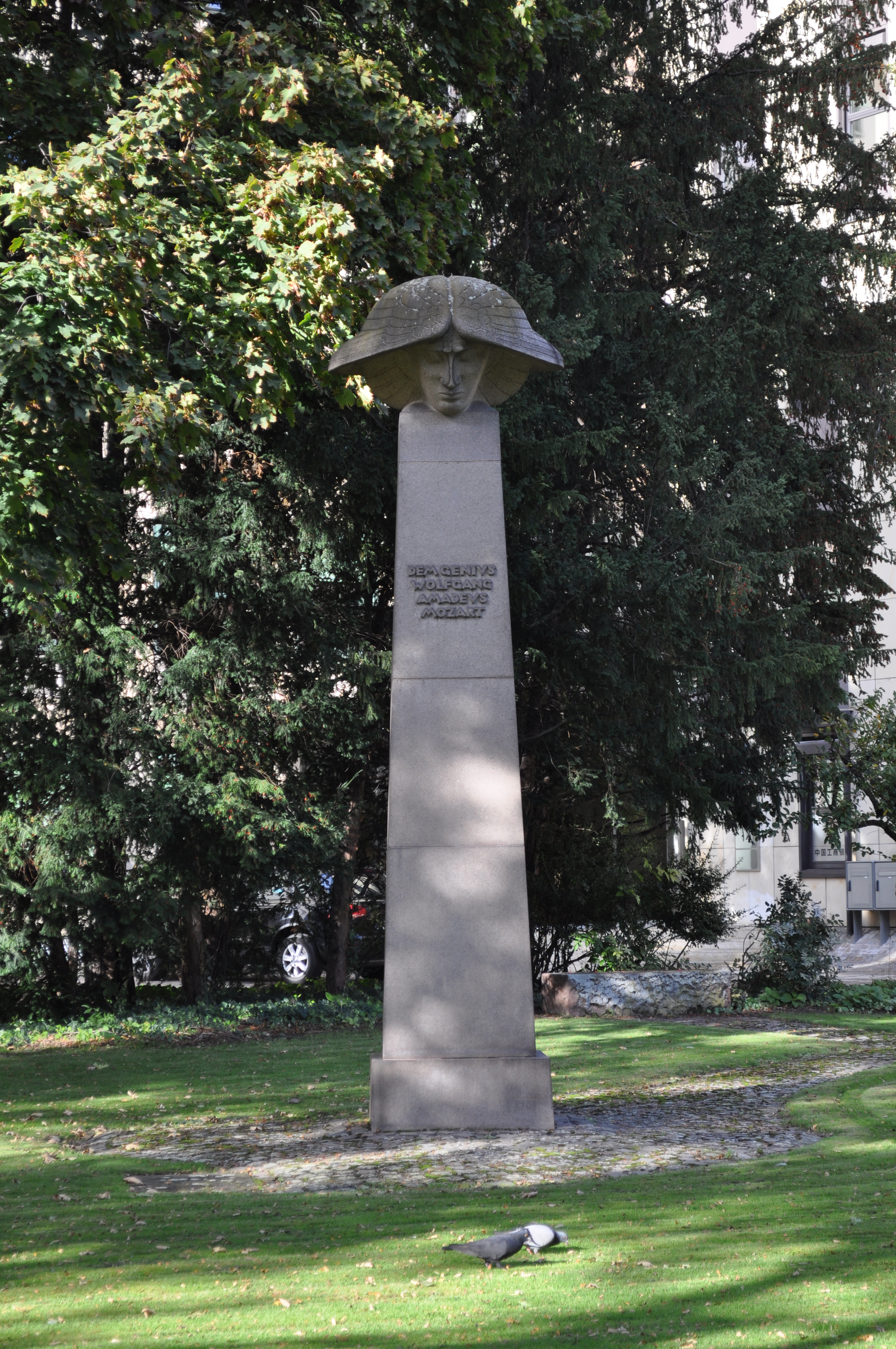
Mozart Monument, 1963, Frankfurt am Main

== See also ==
- Der Rufer
