= 2 Columbus Circle =

Building in Manhattan, New York

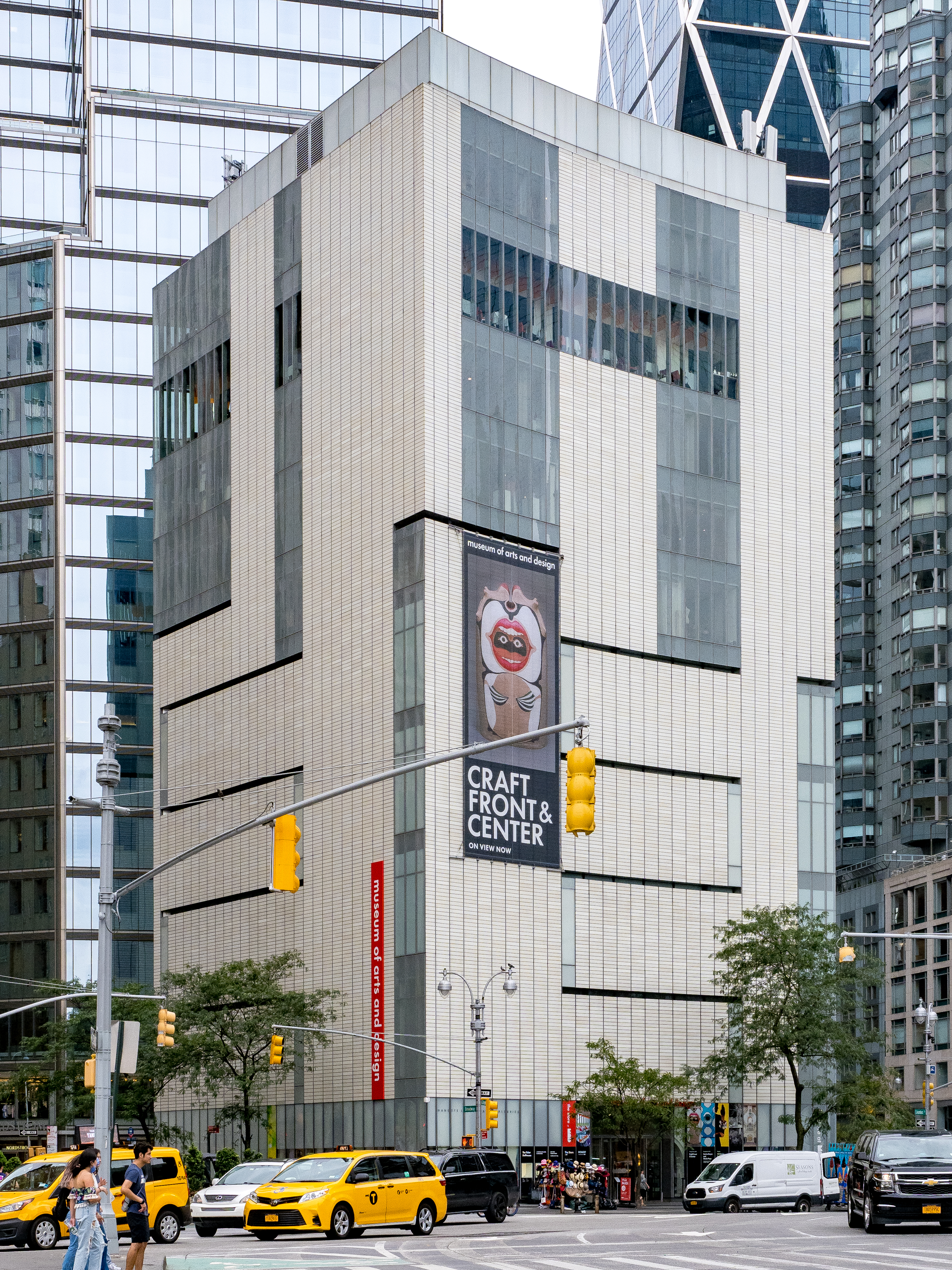
- Interactive map of the 2 Columbus Circle area

General information
- Status: Open
- Type: Museum
- Location: 2 Columbus Circle; New York, NY 10019, New York City, United States
- Coordinates: 40°46′02.5″N 73°58′55″W
- Current tenants: Museum of Arts and Design
- Groundbreaking: 1960
- Opened: March 21, 1964
- Renovated: 2005–2008
- Client: Huntington Hartford
- Landlord: Museum of Arts and Design

Technical details
- Structural system: Concrete bearing wall

Design and construction
- Architects: Edward Durell Stone; Brad Cloepfil (new facade)
- Structural engineer: Cosentini Associates

2 Columbus Circle (formerly the Gallery of Modern Art and the New York Cultural Center) is a nine-story building on the south side of Columbus Circle in the Midtown Manhattan neighborhood of New York City. The building fills a small city block bounded by 58th Street, Columbus Circle, Broadway, and Eighth Avenue. It was originally designed by Edward Durell Stone in the modernist style for A&P heir Huntington Hartford. In the 2000s, Brad Cloepfil redesigned 2 Columbus Circle for the Museum of Arts and Design (MAD), which has occupied the building since 2008.

The exterior walls are made of reinforced concrete, which double as load-bearing walls that support the concrete floor slabs inside. The original facade largely consisted of white Vermont marble slabs, with small windows only at the corner of the building, as well as loggias at the base and top of the building. The current facade consists of terracotta panels separated by deep grooves, as well as large glass panels at the top. The lower stories of the building contain museum space, while the upper stories contain offices. There were originally several mezzanine levels, though these were removed in the 2000s. The original structure and the redesigned building have been the subject of extensive architectural commentary.

Hartford announced plans for the Gallery of Modern Art on the south side of Columbus Circle in June 1956, although construction did not start until 1960 due to various delays. The museum opened on March 21, 1964, and suffered financially for several years. Fairleigh Dickinson University took over the museum in 1969, renaming it the New York Cultural Center, which operated until 1975. Gulf and Western Industries bought 2 Columbus Circle in 1976 and donated it to the New York City government, but the building remained vacant for four years due to various issues. The New York City Department of Cultural Affairs and the New York Convention and Visitors Bureau occupied 2 Columbus Circle from 1980 to 1998, when the city government offered up the building for redevelopment. Following a controversy over the building's proposed renovation in the early 2000s, MAD renovated the building from 2005 to 2008.

== Site ==
2 Columbus Circle is on the southern side of Columbus Circle in the Midtown Manhattan neighborhood of New York City. The building's land lot is irregular and covers 4,624 ft^{2} (429.6 m^{2}). The lot occupies an entire city block bounded by Broadway to the east, 58th Street to the south, Eighth Avenue to the west, and Columbus Circle to the north. The site measures 74 feet (23 m) on Columbus Circle, 76 feet (23 m) on Broadway, 97 feet (30 m) on 58th Street, and 41 feet (12 m) on Eighth Avenue. The northern portion of the block is curved due to the curvature of Columbus Circle. The building occupies its entire lot.

The building is near Central Park to the northeast; 240 Central Park South, the Gainsborough Studios, and 220 Central Park South to the east; 5 Columbus Circle and Central Park Tower to the southeast; Central Park Place to the southwest; Deutsche Bank Center (formerly Time Warner Center) to the west; and Trump International Hotel and Tower to the north. Entrances to the New York City Subway's 59th Street–Columbus Circle station, served by the 1, A, B, C, and D trains, are to the west, east, and south of the building.

In the late 19th and early 20th centuries, Central Park South was developed as Manhattan's "Gold Coast", with many prestigious hotels and apartment buildings being erected on its route. The seven-story Grand Circle Hotel, designed by William H. Cauvet, stood at this address from 1874. (Note: Not to be confused with the later Pabst Grand Circle Hotel on the northwest corner of 58th Street and 8th Avenue.) Later called the Boulevard Hotel, it functioned as an office building by the late 1950s, with a Chevrolet advertisement on its roof.

== Architecture ==
=== Facade ===
The building was designed by Edward Durell Stone for businessman Huntington Hartford, an heir to the A&P supermarket chain. It was originally a nine-story modernist structure. Its exterior wall is made of reinforced concrete, which was used because it was more flexible to construct than a traditional steel structure. The building uses Mo-Sai slabs, which are made of exposed aggregate concrete. The exterior walls double as load-bearing walls, which support the concrete floor slabs inside.

==== Original design ====
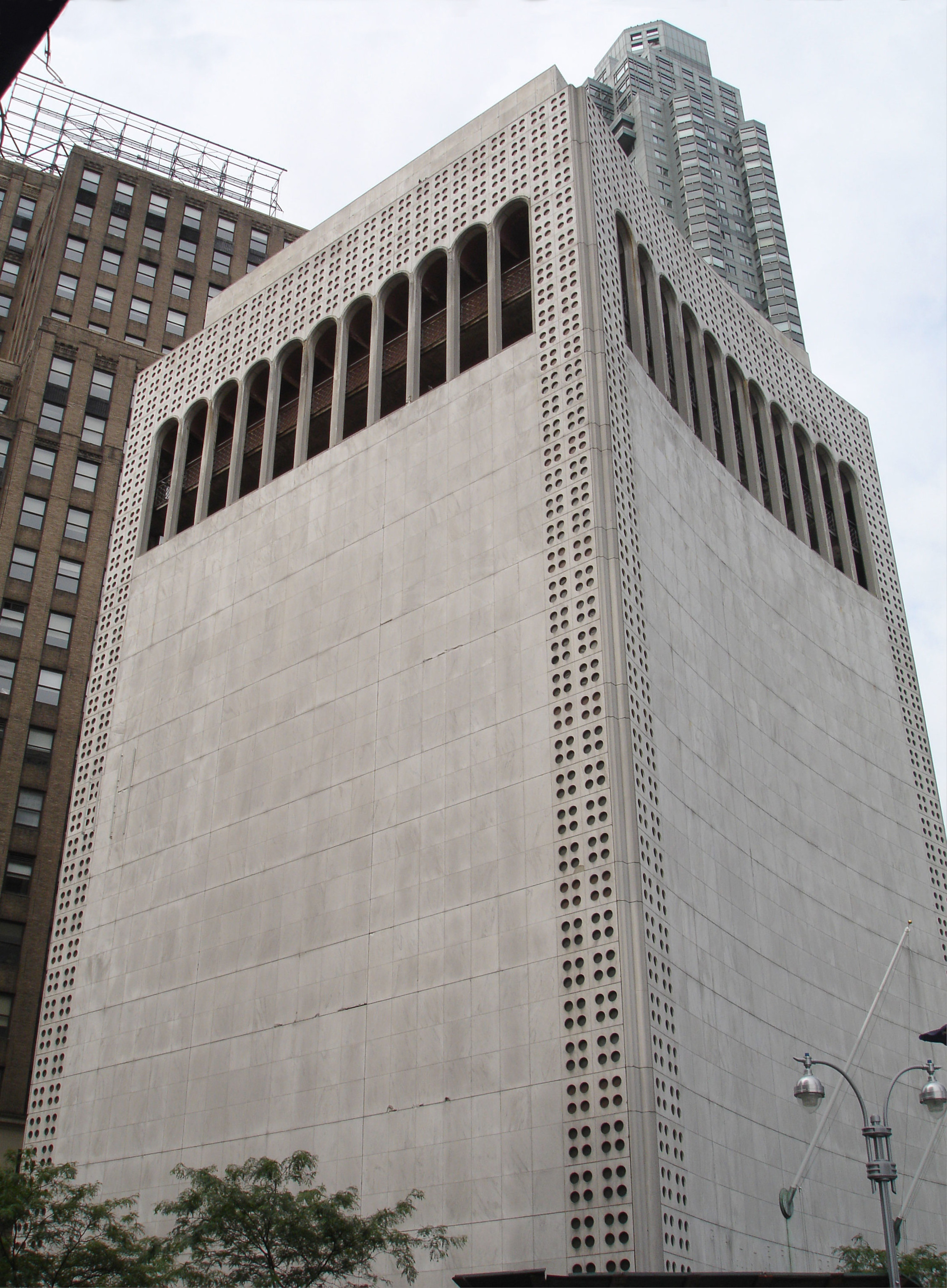
The building's original exterior, photographed in 2005

The facade was largely made of slabs of white Vermont marble, with gray and gold veins; these slabs were originally attached to the concrete wall. Most of the marble panels had no window openings, but there were small circular windows at the corners and top story. The windowless sections of the facade measured 2 inches (51 mm) thick, while the sections with windows were 3 inches (76 mm) thick. To create the window openings, circular marble pieces were carved out of the slabs; these were reused in the lobby and on the sidewalk. There were over 1,000 windows in the original design, each arranged in groups of four. Stone designed the windows to be as small as possible, and the Times and Herald Tribune likened the windows to portholes. Each window had a bronze frame with a hinge that could swing inward. According to Stone, the windows were intended to suggest the rusticated blocks of the Saint-Germain-des-Prés church in Paris. In Stone's original plans for the building, the facade would have been covered with vines or plantings.

The sidewalk around the building was originally made of reddish-brown terrazzo or concrete. Inset into the sidewalk were marble circles measuring 3 feet (0.91 m) across and framed by brass strips; there were also planting pits along the curb. The base of the building contained a loggia of reinforced concrete columns, evocative of that at the Doge's Palace. There were 27 columns in the loggia, which measured 8 feet (2.4 m) high. Above the ground-level loggia were alternating medallions made of red Italian marble and green Vermont marble. The lobby was recessed behind the loggia and had bronze-framed windows facing Columbus Circle; the other three elevations were faced with green marble at ground level. The seventh and eighth floors contained loggias on all elevations of the facade.

==== New design ====
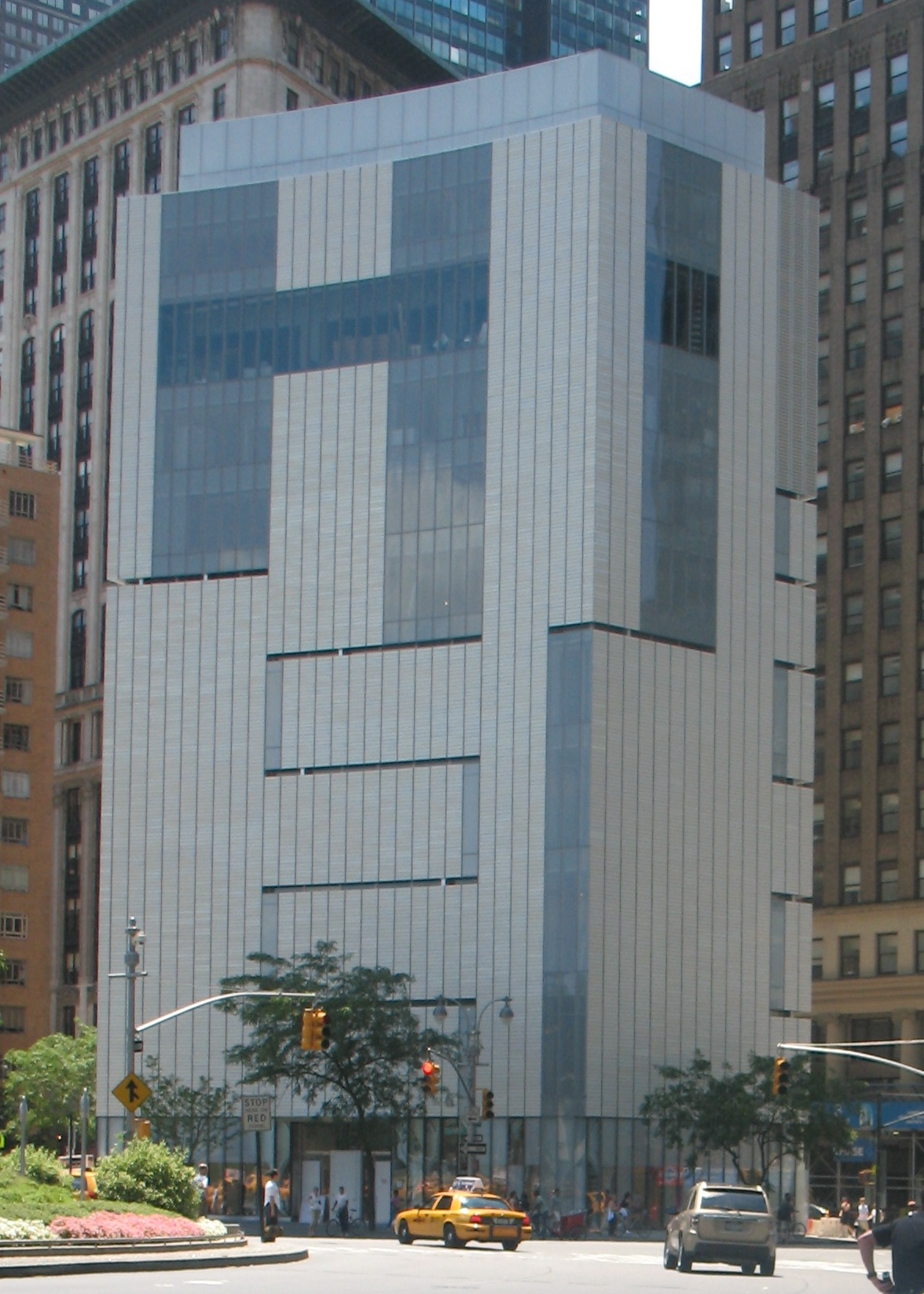
Seen from across Columbus Circle

The current facade, designed by Brad Cloepfil for the Museum of Arts and Design (MAD), reuses the original massing; the upper loggia, the portholes, and the marble panels on the facade were removed. The building's concave curve on Columbus Circle was preserved, as was the ground-story loggia, one of the key portions of the superstructure. The loggia was enclosed behind a 13-foot-high (4.0 m) glass wall. Cloepfil had spoken negatively of Stone's original design, having regarded it as "frightening" ever since the 1970s when he was an architecture student.

The original openings at the facade's corners were removed. The new facade consists of 4-inch-thick (10 cm) terracotta panels separated by deep grooves. The white terracotta panels are stippled, giving a sparkling appearance in sunlight. At different times of day, the panels give the impression that they are slightly changing in color. Behind the terracotta panels are horizontal openings, which measure 30 inches (760 mm) wide and are carved into the outer bearing walls. To reduce deflection, the grooves are spanned by large metal pins. There are one-story-high vertical panels of fritted glass, which connect the grooves on each floor. The glass strips and grooves create continuous strips on each elevation of the facade and are designed in a manner resembling a switchback. There are also glass strips at the northwest and northeast corners of the lower stories, which illuminate the galleries inside.

The top stories use the most glass and are illuminated by transparent, translucent, and fritted glass panels. Cloepfil said he wanted the new design "'to emphasize its role as a marker on Columbus Circle in juxtaposition to all the noise around it". Against Cloepfil's wishes, MAD's board and its director Holly Hotchner ordered that a band of windows be added near the top of the facade. This horizontal element connected two vertical strips of windows on the Columbus Circle elevation, creating an "H" shape. Another vertical strip on the Eighth Avenue elevation was designed in an "I" shape; taken together, the windows appeared to spell out the word "HI" from the northwest.

=== Interior ===
Originally, the building contained 60,000 square feet (5,600 m^{2}) of floor area across nine stories. The elevators originally served alternate floors, which Hartford proposed "for variety's sake". There were also two emergency-exit stairs at the rear corners of the building. The elevators and emergency-exit stairs (which were required under local building codes) occupied a significant portion of the building. As a result, the landings of the staircases were widened to create intermediate mezzanine levels, with smaller display rooms surrounding the double-height main galleries. The mezzanines also had smoking lounges, as well as rooms with pipe-organ music. The Gallery of Modern Art had an Aeolian-Skinner organ, which measured 23 feet (7.0 m) high and was placed on the mezzanine above the second floor. That space was subsequently converted to the Gallery 3D theater, and the organ had been removed by the 2000s.

MAD occupies 54,000 square feet (5,000 m^{2}) across ten above-ground floors and two basement levels. The mezzanines were removed when the building was renovated. Each of the main floors was enlarged to 3,650 square feet (339 m^{2}), more than double the size of the original main floors. To make way for the expanded floor slabs, the mechanical spaces were placed behind the elevators, while the restrooms were relocated to the basement and sixth floor. The old emergency staircases were removed and a new staircase was built around the elevator core. The interior spaces are illuminated by glass channels measuring 30 inches wide. There are also glass columns, which contain a square cross-section and measure 3 or 4 feet (0.91 or 1.22 m) across. To accommodate these columns, the engineers had to construct square openings within each of the floor slabs. Because the superstructure is made of concrete, the engineers could only place openings through about 30 percent of the floor area. The glass channels and columns allow natural light to illuminate the interior. In addition, a six-story-high staircase was built along the Broadway elevation, connecting the museum spaces.

==== Museum spaces ====
When the building was used as the Gallery of Modern Art, the galleries were on the second through fifth floors. The Gallery of Modern Art had 14 galleries in total. The second and third floors were devoted to temporary exhibits, while the fourth and fifth floors contained Huntington's collection. Each story contained a main gallery measuring 13 feet (4.0 m) tall, as well as two smaller galleries. The main gallery on each floor faced Columbus Circle, while the smaller galleries faced Broadway and Eighth Avenue. The main halls on the second and third stories measured 60 by 25 feet (18.3 by 7.6 m), while the secondary halls each measured 18 by 20 feet (5.5 by 6.1 m). There were also walls with gray-blue fabric and walnut paneling, as well as floors with French parquetry. Abe Feder designed the lighting inside each gallery, which was designed over a two-year period. The original lighting system was composed of diagonal troffers in the ceiling, which faced the outer walls of each gallery; the troffers surrounded a dropped ceiling at the center of each gallery.

Following the 2000s renovation, MAD has four floors of exhibition galleries across 14,000 square feet (1,300 m^{2}), about double the size of the exhibition space at MAD's previous building. The space is large enough to house the museum's permanent collection, which numbered 2,000 objects at the time of the renovation. The space also allowed MAD to host multiple temporary exhibits simultaneously; by contrast, the museum's previous building was so small that it had to be closed every time a temporary exhibition was installed. At the time of the building's reopening in 2008, two of the four exhibition floors were used for rotating exhibits.

==== Other spaces ====
In the basement was an auditorium with 154 seats. The auditorium measured 26 feet (7.9 m) deep and contained golden draperies, as well as a red-carpeted floor that extended to the back wall. The golden draperies doubled as sound insulation. The auditorium, subsequently named the Mark Goodson Theater, was the only part of the original design to be preserved in the 2000s renovation. The renovation also preserved the bronze doors leading to the auditorium. When MAD moved into the building in 2008, it started renting out the auditorium for events.

The original lobby's floor contained marble circles that had been cut out of the facade's portholes. In the 2000s, the lobby was enlarged and a museum store for MAD was placed at ground level. The museum store covers 1,400 square feet (130 m^{2}).

The Gallery of Modern Art's offices were on the sixth floor, while the storage and restoration spaces were on the seventh floor. There were 3,500 square feet (330 m^{2}) of storage space, as well as two terraces. When the Museum of Art and Design moved into the building, the sixth and seventh stories were converted to art studios, event spaces, and classrooms. One story was dedicated solely to educational programs, and there were also three artists' studios.

On the Gallery of Modern Art's eighth floor was a cocktail lounge, which had 60 seats. The eighth floor was decorated with rare Macassar ebony, which had to be sourced from a merchant in London, as well as Danish-wool sofas and Oceanic art. The ninth floor contained the Gauguin Room, a 52-seat restaurant with custom tables and tableware; it featured a 75-foot-wide (23 m) terrace facing north. The Gauguin Room served Polynesian food. The ninth-floor restaurant space was renovated in the mid-2000s, with windows on three sides. The restaurant, which reopened as Robert in 2009, serves American cuisine. The space contains 138 seats and can be accessed without entering the museum. It is decorated in an orange, purple, and vermilion color scheme, which in turn is illuminated by orange LED lighting.

== History ==
=== Development ===
==== Planning and disputes ====
Huntington Hartford announced plans for the 10-story Gallery of Modern Art on the south side of Columbus Circle in June 1956. The building would contain a modern-art collection belonging to Hartford and his wife Marjorie Steele, as well as ground-story retail space and a rooftop garden. Hartford had paid nearly $1 million for the land; he estimated that the gallery would cost $1.5 million to construct and would be completed in 1958. The New York Times wrote of the plans: "If in that spot there can now rise something of architectural beauty, the whole face of the Circle, the approach to the Park, and the area near the Coliseum (Note: At the time, the New York Coliseum occupied the west side of Columbus Circle, now the site of the Deutsche Bank Center.) will have been definitely 'lifted'." The New York Herald Tribune said that the planned structure "can be a valuable contribution to New York's architectural scene". Hartford initially collaborated with Hanford Yang, a Chinese-born architecture student at the Massachusetts Institute of Technology, on the design of the museum. Yang's initial proposal called for an 11-story structure with a pair of interlocked concrete cylinders, sheathed in a plastic facade.

Winslow Ames was hired as the museum's director in September 1957, and Hartford said two months later that the project would begin "within six months to a year". In May 1958, Hartford hired Stone as the architect, since Yang was not registered to practice architecture in New York state. By then, the museum was to cost $3 million and be completed in a year. Stone initially retained Yang as a project manager but soon revised the design drastically. Stone's first proposal filled the whole block and consisted largely of a blank facade, with windows arranged in a narrow vertical strip and along the top floor. His second proposal was published in 1959; it called for a mesh-like facade, with an exposed superstructure at the bottom and top, as well as a rooftop terrace. Both of Stone's proposals were intended to complement the neoclassical 5 Columbus Circle diagonally to the southeast. Stone and Hartford spent ten days just on refining various architectural models for the building.

The Museum of Modern Art (MoMA) requested an injunction in early 1959 to prevent Hartford from using the "Gallery of Modern Art" name. Hartford ultimately was allowed to keep the "Gallery" name. Stone filed plans for the gallery with the New York City Department of Buildings (DOB) in April 1959, as the naming dispute was ongoing. Most tenants had left by July 1959, and demolition was supposed to have begun in August, with the gallery being completed in early 1961. The last remaining tenant was a shoe store, whose owner argued that he could only be evicted if an office building was built on the site. Though the New York Supreme Court ruled against the shoe store, the store's owner appealed the decision to the New York Court of Appeals, prompting Hartford to postpone the gallery's opening by one year. The Court of Appeals refused to hear the store's appeal in February 1960, and the shoe store finally vacated the site.

==== Construction ====
Hartford procured numerous works of art for the new museum, including a large mural by Salvador Dalí entitled The Discovery of America by Christopher Columbus. After his divorce from Steele in 1960, he bought five of his ex-wife's paintings for the museum. In total, the museum was to contain at least 30 sculptures and 75 paintings from Hartford's personal art collection. Hartford wanted his gallery to represent an alternative view of modernism; his art collection included works by Rembrandt, Monet, Manet, Turner, and Dalí. Ames announced in December 1960 that the museum would set aside two stories of galleries to photography exhibits. An advisory board would select the photography exhibits, which would be changed every 18 to 24 months. In 1961, Ames resigned from his position as the museum's director; the Herald Tribune reported that Ames and Hartford had disagreed over artistic taste. Hartford was also greatly involved in the design aspect of the building.

The museum's exterior was completed by January 1962, at which point construction costs had increased to $5 million. The building's small site had significantly slowed down construction due to the lack of a suitable staging area. The project engineer J. Gilbert Parker attributed the construction delays to the building's lack of right angles, saying: "It was like making a watch out of concrete". Originally, the eighth floor was supposed to have contained offices for Hartford and for the museum's curator, but these were scrapped in favor of a gallery. Hartford hired Carl J. Weinhardt Jr. as the museum's new director in 1963, two years after Ames's resignation. Margaret Potter was hired as the museum's curator. The museum's staff planned to use the rotating exhibitions to showcase "certain relatively neglected phases" of 19th-and 20th-century art. In late 1963, Weinhardt selected the museum's first temporary exhibition, a showcase of surrealist paintings by Pavel Tchelitchew. At the time, the museum's staff had already moved into the building. The construction cost had increased to $7.4 million, about five times the original budget, by the time the museum was completed.

=== Opening and museum use ===
==== Gallery of Modern Art ====
In advance of the museum's opening, in mid-March 1964, WABC-TV and WNBC-TV broadcast "No. 2 Columbus Circle", an hour-long video tour of the museum. Prior to the official opening, the museum had several preview events with guests such as Ivan Sergeyevich Obolensky and Prince Aschwin of Lippe-Biesterfeld. The Gallery of Modern Art opened to the public on March 21, 1964, with 3,358 visitors on its first day. At the time, the museum had 25 staff members and 45 guards; its operating costs were estimated at $600,000 per year. The museum had almost 40,000 guests in its first two weeks. The museum's early exhibits included retrospectives of the work of artists Jean Hélion, Reginald Marsh, and Salvador Dalí, as well as a set of paintings depicting New York City over a 50-year period. The museum also hosted short recitals by contemporary musicians. The Gallery of Modern Art began screening rare and classic films three times daily in April 1965, and the photography gallery opened the next month. Grace Glueck of The New York Times wrote that Hartford's art "did not exactly draw rave notices from the critics".

Not long after its opening, the Gallery of Modern Art was suffering financially. Though the museum charged an admission fee of $1 per person, it only had an average of 500 visitors on weekdays and 1,000 visitors on weekends, not enough to cover the annual operating expenses. This prompted Hartford to reorganize the museum as a nonprofit organization in mid-1965, appointing a board of trustees to manage the museum's programming and finances. Hartford also asked officials at Columbia University and New York University if they were willing to help fund the museum, though neither university was interested in doing so. Over the following year, 750 people signed up as patrons of the museum, each paying $15 to $500 a year. The museum opened a section "for the perpetuation and viewing of the best works of television" in late 1965. Weinhardt resigned as the museum's director that November, leaving the museum without a director for the next five years. The museum continued to host exhibits through 1966, including a series of animated shorts by Faith and John Hubley and a showcase of ancient Egyptian objects.

The museum continued to operate with a $580,000 annual deficit, and the museum had to spend $320,000 a year on paying off its mortgage. Hartford started selling off objects in his collection, raising $200,000 by April 1966. He planned to sell or lease 2 Columbus Circle, although a large art company had already declined an offer to lease the building because it was too large. In September 1966, Hartford offered to convey the building to Fordham University, though Fordham was hesitant to assume the building's $3.8 million mortgage. Fordham planned to move its communication-arts program in the building. The museum still hosted exhibitions and events over the next two years. Among its offerings in 1967 and 1968 were a painting collection loaned by the Montreal Museum of Fine Arts, a set of paintings by former president Dwight D. Eisenhower, a showcase of 19th-century Russian antiques, and a selection of sports films.

==== New York Cultural Center ====
Peter Sammartino, the chancellor of Fairleigh Dickinson University in New Jersey, expressed interest in the Gallery of Modern Art's exhibits in the late 1960s. Hartford transferred ownership of 2 Columbus Circle to the university in July 1969, and the Gallery of Modern Art was renamed the New York Cultural Center. As part of the agreement, Hartford would give at least $5 million to the university if it operated the New York Cultural Center for five years. Hartford also donated $1 million to the museum's operations, and Fairleigh S. Dickinson gave $2.5 million to help pay off the mortgage. In addition, both men agreed to cover a portion of the museum's deficit. The Cultural Center was operated by a seven-member board of trustees; the university had five seats and Hartford and his financial advisor had two seats. The university hired Raymond Rohauer as the cultural center's film curator and director, though Rohauer resigned after less than a year.

The center appointed its first director, Donald H. Karshan, in January 1970. That month, John Canaday wrote for The New York Times: "Since the change of name, the center has seemed to be willing to exhibit just about anything in order to keep the walls covered..." The Cultural Center hosted 150 shows in its five years of operation. The auditorium also hosted musical performances and film retrospectives. Mario Amaya was hired as the Cultural Center's director in early 1972. Under Amaya's leadership, daily attendance tripled from December 1971 to December 1972, with 130,000 annual visitors in that period. The basement auditorium hosted its first legitimate theatrical shows in mid-1972. Amaya planned to exhibit objects from obscure New York City museums, and he wished to expand the Cultural Center's film and musical offerings. The Wall Street Journal wrote that the auditorium hosted film screenings, organ recitals, and experimental theater performances.

In October 1974, Fairleigh Dickinson University indicated it would no longer operate the Cultural Center, citing increasing expenses, waning public support, and the expiration of its agreement with Hartford. The New York Cultural Center's trustees began seeking a buyer for the property, considering bids only from organizations that could take "full responsibility, including purchase", of 2 Columbus Circle. The trustees first put the building for sale in March 1975 for $6 million but subsequently lowered that price. The museum closed on September 14, 1975, and a cocktail party commemorating the museum was hosted the following week. Art critic Hilton Kramer wrote that the museum's closure, "while very far from being in any way central or catastrophic to New York art life, is nonetheless saddening". Following the Cultural Center's closure, St. Vincent's Hospital considered acquiring 2 Columbus Circle for $1 million and converting it into a nursing school, but the hospital dismissed the idea. Several other organizations also declined to occupy the building.

=== New York City government use ===
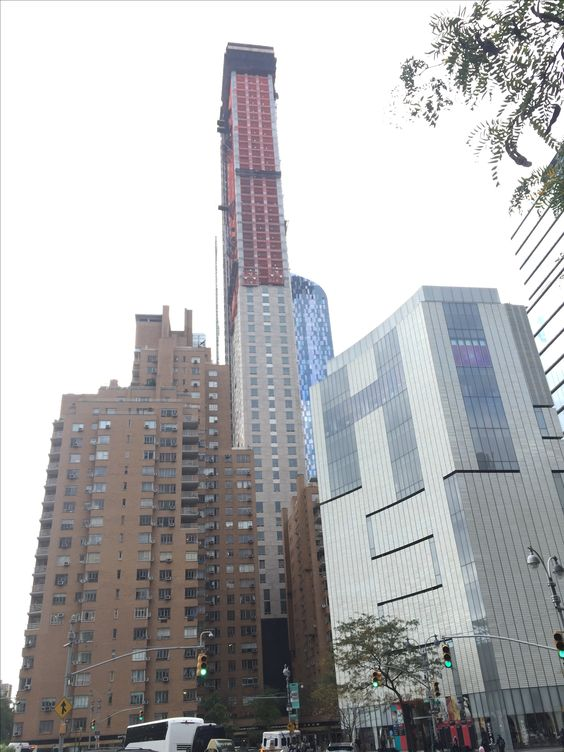
Eastward view of Columbus Circle from the Deutsche Bank Center. Seen from left to right are 240 Central Park South, 220 Central Park South (under construction), One57 (in the background), and 2 Columbus Circle.

In December 1976, Gulf and Western Industries announced that it would purchase 2 Columbus Circle and donate the building to the government of New York City, as part of an agreement with outgoing mayor Abraham Beame. The structure would be converted into offices for the New York City Department of Cultural Affairs (DCLA) and the New York Convention and Visitors Bureau. As part of the acquisition, the property title would first be transferred to Phoenix Mutual Life Insurance, which held a $1 million first mortgage on the building. Gulf and Western would then pay off the first mortgage, acquire the building, and deed it to the city government. Gulf and Western would spend $700,000 in total, paying $300,000 for renovations and $400,000 in maintenance costs. Gulf and Western chairman Charles Bluhdorn explained his decision to buy 2 Columbus Circle: "More than ever, this is the time for confidence and credibility in our country and our city." At the time, Gulf and Western was housed at 15 Columbus Circle, immediately to the north.

The city government would have paid no property taxes, prompting complaints from two private developers who had separately wanted to buy 2 Columbus Circle, paying $100,000 a year in property taxes. The plan was delayed for two years after Ed Koch took over as city's mayor in 1977; the building stood empty during this time. The delay was in part because Gulf and Western had to negotiate with both mayoral administrations over maintenance costs. Additionally, though the building was being renovated at the time, the Koch administration would not commit to the project in the wake of the 1975 New York City fiscal crisis. Other organizations expressed interest in 2 Columbus Circle, including the Parsons School of Design. Gulf and Western ultimately agreed to spend $900,000 on maintenance over four years. Cultural Affairs commissioner Henry Geldzahler and his partner Christopher Scott oversaw the renovation, which left the building's materials and open spaces largely intact.

The city government announced in May 1979 that the DCLA and the Convention and Visitors Bureau would move into the building later that year. The New York City Board of Estimate voted to accept Gulf and Western's donation of 2 Columbus Circle to the city in February 1980. Under the terms of the gift, the New York City government was obliged to use the building solely for "cultural purposes". This stipulation was part of a "reversionary interest" clause that ran for thirty years; if the city government did not use the building for cultural purposes during that period, Gulf and Western could take back ownership. Koch dedicated the DCLA's offices at 2 Columbus Circle in November 1980. The DCLA occupied four stories and rented out the restaurant and auditorium, and the Visitors Bureau had an information booth in the lobby and offices on three other floors.

The city government opened the City Gallery on the second story in April 1981. Among the City Gallery's exhibits were artwork by New Yorkers, paintings by elderly citizens, and a showcase of works from the city's Percent for art program. The Visitors Bureau had 250,000 annual visitors. The building's small size continued to pose a hindrance for its occupants, at least from the public's point of view. In 1991, Paul Goldberger wrote in the Times that the city government offices fit "no better into its awkward, cramped galleries than Mr. Hartford's pictures did." Viacom, which had acquired Gulf and Western in the 1990s, inherited the building's reversionary interest. As part of a $15 million tax-incentive agreement with Viacom in 1994, the New York City Economic Development Corporation (EDC) acquired the reversionary interest in 2 Columbus Circle. Consequently, the city government was no longer obligated to use the building solely for cultural purposes.

=== Sale and redevelopment ===
==== Early efforts ====
By October 1995, under mayor Rudolph Giuliani, the New York City government was planning to sell or lease the building back to the private sector. The government had yet to find new space for the DCLA and the Visitors Bureau. In July 1996, faced with the increasing difficulty of selling off the neighboring New York Coliseum for development, the city government also offered 2 Columbus Circle for redevelopment. That year, Robert A. M. Stern cited 2 Columbus Circle as one of 35 modern-style buildings that he thought should be designated as city landmarks. Since it was more than thirty years old, the building was technically old enough to be designated as a city landmark. A four-member committee of the New York City Landmarks Preservation Commission (LPC) had declined to consider designating the building as a landmark in June 1996. Although architecture critic Herbert Muschamp believed there was little chance of 2 Columbus Circle's survival, the building received a high amount of attention from preservationists.

In February 1997, the EDC announced that it had received seven proposals for the site, most of which called for the building's renovation. Among those interested in the building were the Dahesh Museum of Art, as well as developer Donald Trump, who was renovating the nearby Gulf and Western Building. The Dahesh Museum proposed converting 2 Columbus Circle back into a museum, expanding its own space considerably in the process. Trump, who had spoken negatively of 2 Columbus Circle, planned to demolish the building to make way for the hotel; he was the only bidder who proposed destroying the building. That April, the New York City Council's Land Use Committee voted to prevent the DCLA, the building's only tenant, from leasing office space elsewhere. The committee expressed concern that the Giuliani administration did not even disclose general details about the site's future. The Giuliani administration claimed that, because the EDC owned 2 Columbus Circle's reversionary interest, the building did not have to undergo public review, which typically was required as part of the Uniform Land Use Review Procedure.

The visitor center in the building closed in September 1997, and the DCLA vacated 2 Columbus Circle in April 1998. Filmmakers occasionally used the empty building for film shoots, painting over portions of the wood paneling inside. EDC officials had not yet picked a developer for 2 Columbus Circle because they wanted the site to be redeveloped along with the Coliseum; the city selected a developer for the Coliseum project, which became Time Warner Center, in July 1998. That October, the Alexander Calder Foundation proposed renovating 2 Columbus Circle's facade. At the time, the most expensive offer for the site was Dahesh Museum's $10 million proposal, which had received considerable support from the public. Among the supporters of Dahesh's bid were Huntington Hartford's daughter Juliet Hartford; New York state senator Thomas K. Duane; sculptor Richard Lippold; historian Robert Rosenblum; and local community group Committee for Environmentally Sound Development. Conversely, the Giuliani administration preferred Trump's proposal to demolish the building. The project remained stalled through the end of the 1990s.

==== Selection of developer ====
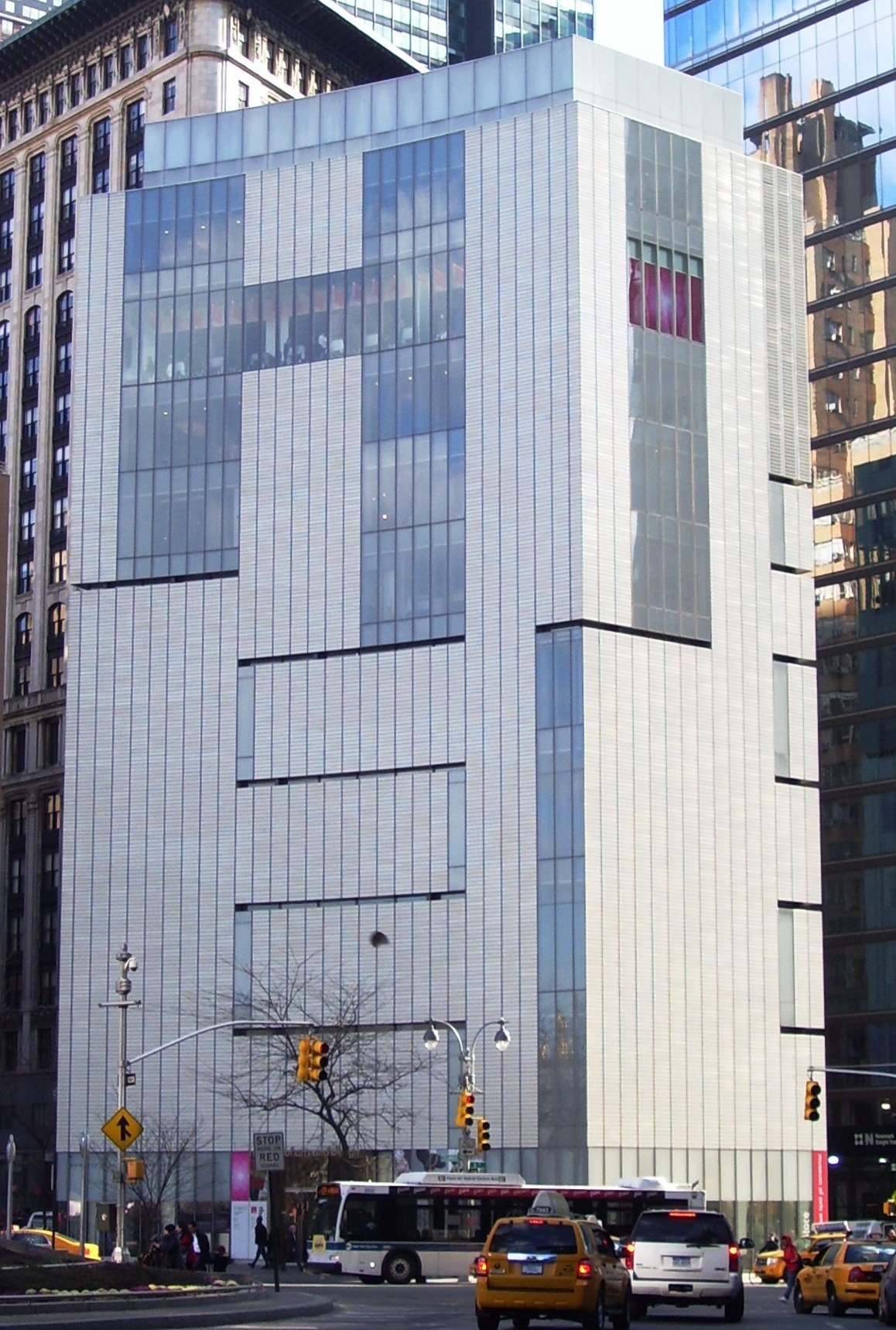
2 Columbus Circle with its new facade, February 2011

In March 2000, the Giuliani administration again started soliciting bids for 2 Columbus Circle. The previous redevelopment effort had been abandoned because it had been planned in conjunction with Time Warner Center, which was already underway. This time, the city government sought to replace the building entirely, with the EDC describing 2 Columbus Circle as a "prime location for residential apartments". The city received thirteen bids by the deadline of May 2, 2000, including two bids from Joseph Moinian and the Dahesh Museum, who both proposed preserving the exterior as-is. Several major developers, such as hotelier Ian Schrager, had declined to submit bids for 2 Columbus Circle. Preservationists continued advocating for the building to be designated as a city landmark. Even though the LPC had indicated that it would not hold landmark hearings for the building, many supporters of 2 Columbus Circle's preservation had coalesced behind Dahesh's bid.

Though city officials had initially promised that the building would be sold quickly, the EDC had still not selected a winning bid after over a year. In March 2001, the Giuliani administration directed the Columbus Circle advisory board to review the proposals for 2 Columbus Circle. At the end of Giuliani's tenure as mayor in December 2001, there were rumors that Giuliani had selected Trump as the site's developer, but the EDC denied the allegations. Trump claimed in 2002 that Giuliani had promised to designate him as the site's developer. By early 2002, a decision was still pending, and members of the public expressed concerns about the lack of transparency surrounding the project.

Under the administration of newly elected mayor Michael Bloomberg, the EDC announced in June 2002 that it would sell 2 Columbus Circle to the American Craft Museum (later the Museum of Arts and Design, or MAD). The museum had not been one of the original bidders. Its bid of $15–20 million was slightly lower than Trump's bid, but EDC president Andrew Alper said Trump's proposal had been rejected because there were already two hotels next to Columbus Circle. The city government planned to sell 2 Columbus Circle for $17 million and allocate another $4.5 million in funding to the project. The American Craft Museum planned to spend at least $30 million on renovations, including replacement of the deteriorating facade. The museum invited small architectural firms to submit proposals for redesigning 2 Columbus Circle, and eleven firms expressed interest. In mid-2002, the American Craft Museum selected four finalists (Note: Zaha Hadid, Smith/Miller + Hawkinson Architects, Toshiko Mori, and Allied Works Architecture) to participate in an architectural design competition for the building. The museum rebranded itself as the Museum of Arts and Design that October.

==== Preservation controversy ====
MAD hired Brad Cloepfil of the firm Allied Works Architecture to redesign 2 Columbus Circle in November 2002. Cloepfil's design for the headquarters of Wieden+Kennedy and Portland Institute for Contemporary Art, as well as that for the Contemporary Art Museum St. Louis, had influenced museum officials to hire him. Cloepfil, who was based in Portland, Oregon, opened an office in New York City specifically to oversee the building's renovation. Meanwhile, preservationist groups continued to advocate for retaining Stone's design. These included Landmark West and the American Institute of Architects, which sponsored a panel discussion about 2 Columbus Circle in early 2003. By then, the facade was in such bad shape that a sidewalk shed had been erected around the building to protect pedestrians from falling debris. Architectural critic Ada Louise Huxtable, who criticized the preservation efforts, said the metal pieces behind the facade's marble slabs had rusted so severely that the entire facade would have to be replaced anyway.

Cloepfil presented designs for the building's renovation to the New York City Planning Commission in March 2003. The announcement was controversial, and several opponents wrote editorials about the design. Preservationists requested that the LPC hold public hearings for 2 Columbus Circle, but the commissioners were reluctant to do so, as they did not believe the building had cultural, architectural, or historical merit. In November 2003, several groups and individuals filed a lawsuit in the New York Supreme Court to prevent the building's sale from being finalized. The plaintiffs requested a environmental impact assessment for 2 Columbus Circle. The same month, the Preservation League of New York State placed 2 Columbus Circle on its "Seven to Save", its annual list of the state's most endangered historic sites. The National Trust for Historic Preservation also described 2 Columbus Circle as being one of the United States' "most endangered historic places" in 2004.

Cloepfil revised his design in January 2004. A state judge ruled against the preservationists that April, allowing the sale to proceed. The museum had difficulties fundraising for its new quarters; the museum's budget had risen to $50 million by mid-2004, but MAD had only raised half that amount. Meanwhile, the vacant interior spaces had deteriorated considerably, and some areas had been damaged by burst water pipes. Other parts of the building had buckled or warped wooden floors and moisture-damaged walls. Fences had been erected around the ground-floor loggia to deter homeless people from sleeping there.

Manhattan borough officials approved the sale of the building to MAD for $17 million in August 2004. Landmark West and the National Trust for Historic Preservation sued in an attempt to nullify the approval, but a state judge upheld the previous ruling in early 2005. Preservationists, joined by residents of the nearby Parc Vendome development, then filed a lawsuit to force the LPC to hold a public hearing for 2 Columbus Circle. The LPC refused to host another hearing on the matter, and MAD signed a contract in May 2005 to finalize its purchase. Preservationists next accused LPC chairman Robert Tierney of colluding with MAD, filing a lawsuit in an attempt to remove him from his position. That June, the World Monuments Fund (WMF) cited Stone's design as being among the world's 100 most endangered sites for 2006.

=== Museum of Arts and Design use ===
==== Renovation ====
On June 29, 2005, a week after the WMF list was published, the DOB approved an alteration permit for renovations to 2 Columbus Circle. Members of the LPC continued to disagree publicly over the merits of designating the building as a city landmark. Sarah Bradford Landau, one of the four LPC commissioners who had voted not to hold a full hearing for the building in 1996, was among those in favor of hosting a public hearing. A state court ruled in favor of MAD in September 2005. The museum finalized its purchase of 2 Columbus Circle the next month. At this point, MAD had raised $48 million of its $65 million capital fund. Seven legal challenges, which included five lawsuits and two appeals, had increased the project's budget to $40 million. MAD director Holly Hotchner saw a benefit to the legal disputes, saying: "The controversy has given us $5 million of free advertising."

Landmark West filed its eighth legal challenge against the project in October 2005, as construction was starting. The group failed to halt the project and, in November 2005, installed a "shame cam" that livestreamed the work on the facade. Work on the building was temporarily halted in early 2006 after workers were caught using a small bulldozer to demolish portions of the structure that were supposed to have been deconstructed manually. Most of 2 Columbus Circle's marble facade had been removed by April 2006. To raise additional money for the museum, a billboard for the film The Da Vinci Code had been erected on the scaffolding around the building. The billboard's presence prompted controversy soon after it was erected, especially among preservationists who had opposed the renovation, and MAD disassembled the sign within two weeks. By mid-2007, the exterior marble cladding and portholes had been removed, and workers had made incisions in the concrete floors and walls.

==== Reopening and occupancy ====
MAD's capital fund had increased to $95 million by mid-2008, of which $85 million had been raised. The museum also renamed 2 Columbus Circle the Jerome and Simona Chazen Building, after the capital campaign's chairman Jerome Chazen and his wife Simona. MAD opened its new location at 2 Columbus Circle on September 27, 2008. At the time, the restaurant atop the building was projected to open early the next year. The renovation of 2 Columbus Circle was one of several projects to be completed around Columbus Circle in the 2000s, including the Time Warner Center and a reconstruction of the circle itself.

The ninth-floor restaurant was named Robert, after event planner Robert Isabell, who had been involved in its development before his death in mid-2009. Robert ultimately opened in December 2009. In part because of the Columbus Circle location, MAD had 500,000 visitors in 2009 alone, far surpassing its projections of 300,000 annual visitors. As of 2021, MAD continued to occupy 2 Columbus Circle; one former director, Glenn Adamson, described the building as being "expensive to operate". The Robert restaurant and the gift shop generated $1.8 million in annual income, more than the amount raised through museum subscriptions in 2019.

== Reception ==
=== Original structure ===
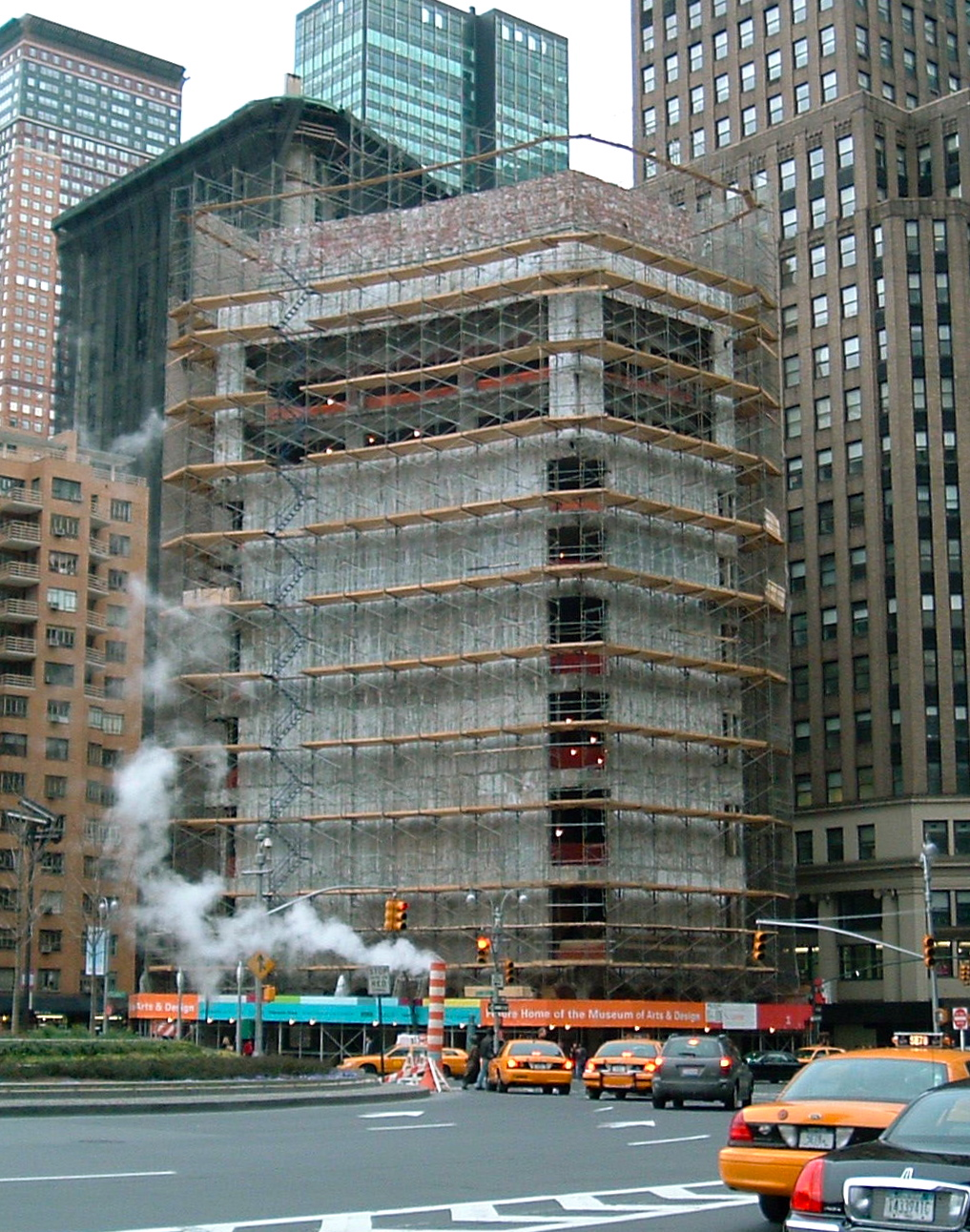
During facade reconstruction

When 2 Columbus Circle was built, there was much criticism of its design. The Times reported in 1963 that the building had been likened to a seraglio and a traffic island. Ada Louise Huxtable derided 2 Columbus Circle as a "die-cut Venetian palazzo on lollypops", leading the building to be nicknamed "The Lollipop Building". The critic Alfred Frankfurter took issue with the wood paneling in the museum and the "spurious South Sea atmosphere" of the restaurants. Even the building's architectural style was disputed. The critic Stuart Preston compared the building to a Venetian palazzo, but Frankfurter wrote: "To attribute a 'Venetian' style to the design is to libel on the grandeur of the Queen of the Adriatic." Architectural critic Herbert Muschamp said much of the controversy arose from the fact that "this cultural campanile violated the modernist taboo against historically derived decoration".

Conversely, when 2 Columbus Circle opened, Thomas V. Ennis of the Times wrote that the building was a "bright spot" on the midtown section of Eighth Avenue. Olga Gueft, writing for Interiors magazine, said the colonnades and portholes "are too winsome for heavyweight criticism", contrasting with the "glittering ice-cage architecture" that was prevalent across New York City at the time. Newsday wrote that the building "represents a vivid departure from the steel-and-glass towers that have dominated many of New York's avenues in recent years." Ellen Perry of Progressive Architecture wrote: "This gallery is Stone-work, from what might be called the Middle Stone Age".

In 1974, Manuela Hoelterhoff wrote for The Wall Street Journal: "Slowly, that architectural oddity [...] is recovering from its peculiar birth in the middle of a traffic island 10 years ago", largely because of the Cultural Center's diverse offerings. The next year, John Canaday wrote in The New York Times that the building was a "white elephant", constricted largely by its small lot area and designed "in a weak moment" for Stone. According to novelist Tom Wolfe, the building was so widely disliked that Stone had to resort "to saying such things as, 'Every taxi driver in New York will tell you it's his favorite building.'" By the late 1990s, Huxtable said she got "a little lift, a sense of pleasure" when she walked past 2 Columbus Circle, as it was the circle's "only identifiable object". Muschamp called the building "a latter-day tribute to John Ruskin and the road not taken by modern architects after the collapse of the Gothic Revival in the late 19th century". In 2003, Laurie Kerr of The Wall Street Journal compared 2 Columbus Circle to the original World Trade Center, saying that neither project "ever fit into any of the architectural narratives of the city" as Lever House and the Plaza Hotel did.

==== Commentary on renovation ====
When 2 Columbus Circle was proposed for redevelopment in the late 1990s, there was much commentary in favor of preservation. Robert A. M. Stern believed the building merited landmark protection "by any and every standard of what a landmark is", and he described the structure as "important, thoughtful and carefully articulated". Tom Wolfe also spoke in favor of preservation, saying: that the building "really is a jewel. It's this lovely white [...] piece of drama!" David Childs, the architect of the Time Warner Center, expressed support for preserving Stone's design at 2 Columbus Circle. Other commentators favored the building's redevelopment. Donald Trump said 2 Columbus Circle "has got to be the worst building in the city of New York" and that it was "universally disliked" until the redevelopment plans were announced. The Calder Foundation's director Alexander S. C. Rower said: "We don't like Ed Stone's portholes."

Controversy continued after Cloepfil was announced as the renovation architect in 2002. Bernard Tschumi of the Columbia Graduate School of Architecture, Planning and Preservation held an unfavorable view of the facade's renovation, saying that Stone's original design should either be preserved or the entire structure should be razed. Kate Wood of Landmark West said the plan "utterly erases Stone's vision for 2 Columbus Circle" in discarding the portholes and loggias, while Wolfe wrote a two-part New York Times editorial detailing his objections to the new design. By contrast, MAD director Holly Hotchner likened the existing design to a mausoleum, while MoMA curator Terence Riley compared the building to "a patient that has been on life support for so long that none of the doctors are still alive".

The LPC's refusal to hold public hearings for the building was itself a subject of contention. Muschamp described the LPC's decision as "a shocking dereliction of public duty", and Nicolai Ouroussoff cited the building as an example of the LPC's inability "to distinguish between preserving the city's architectural legacy and embalming it". Wolfe expressed a similar view against the LPC commissioners at a press conference in 2004, saying: "When anyone asks about 2 Columbus Circle, the commissioners dive under their desks." Conversely, Justin Davidson opposed the efforts to designate the building as a city landmark, saying it "minimizes flexibility and privileges the status quo, which in this case is dilapidation and uselessness". Huxtable concurred with this view, writing in The Wall Street Journal that opponents seemed "to be operating by tunnel vision and a blind resistance to change". According to Huxtable, the attempts at preservation amounted to "an unworthy performance that did little credit to anyone who cares about preservation and can only serve as an object lesson of how not to go about it."

=== Renovated structure ===
James Gardner, architecture critic for the New York Sun wrote that the original building "was indubitably a landmark; the best that can be said for its replacement is that, if we're lucky, no one will ever notice it." Five years after the renovation was complete, Gardner maintained that the redesigned structure was "far inferior" to Stone's original design. Francis Morrone, also of the Sun, wrote: "Where Stone's original building read as neatly scaled to its setting, Mr. Cloepfil's redesign reads as a piece of abstract sculpture that, at building scale, seems all wrong." Witold Rybczynski wrote in Slate that the new design "feels like an alien presence", and architecture critic Justin Davidson said, "This version won't satisfy those who thought it should never have been touched." In 2008, Ouroussoff named the renovated building as one of seven buildings in New York City that should be torn down because they "have a traumatic effect on the city".

Some critics defended the new facade. Huxtable wrote that "criticism of the structure has been alarmingly out of proportion and flagrantly out of control". Paul Goldberger praised the new building's "functional, logical, and pleasant" interior in a review in The New Yorker, even though the "proportions and composition seem just as odd and awkward as they ever did".
