= Stanley S. Lasdon =

American pharmaceutical executive and philanthropist

- Born: 1910; Brooklyn, New York
- Died: January, 1993 (age 83)
- Education: St. John's University
- Occupations: Pharmaceutical executive Philanthropist
- Known for: Warner-Lambert, The Lasdon Foundation
- Spouse: Gene Schwarzer
- Children: 3
- Family: Lasdon

Stanley S. Lasdon (1910 – January, 1993) was an American pharmaceutical executive and philanthropist. Along with his brothers, he was a director the Warner-Lambert Company and a founder of the Lasdon Foundation, for which he later served as president.

== Early life and education ==
Stanley S. Lasdon was born to a Jewish family in Brooklyn, New York in 1910. He was one of seven children including brothers Jacob S. Lasdon, William S. Lasdon, Philip S. Lasdon, Milton Lasdon, and sisters Mrs. Francis Milch and Mrs. Miriam Gerrity. Lasdon earned a law degree at St. John's University in 1936.

== Career ==
Following his law school graduation, Lasdon joined his brothers in starting the Nepera Chemical Company, a maker of prescription drugs. Nepera was acquired by Warner-Lambert in 1956, which was itself later acquired by Pfizer. Lasdon remained a vice president of Warner-Lambert for two years and served as a member of the board of directors until 1972.

At his death, he was president of the Lasdon Foundation, a family philanthropy established in 1946 to support medical research and cultural institutions. Longtime beneficiaries of its grants have been the New York Hospital-Cornell Medical Center and the Lincoln Center for the Performing Arts.

== Personal life ==
Lasdon was married to the former Gene Schwarzer for 50 years. They had a daughter Susan Abrams and a two sons, Richard H. Lasdon and Jeffrey S. Lasdon. His niece was art collector and philanthropist Nanette L. Laitman. The family's country estate is now the Lasdon Park and Arboretum.
