= Hotchner =

Hotchner is a surname. Notable people with the surname include:

- A. E. Hotchner (1917–2020), American writer
- Holly Hotchner, American museum director
- John Hotchner, American philatelist and philatelic writer

== Fictional characters ==
- Aaron Hotchner, a character in the television series Criminal Minds
