= Museum of Arts and Design =

Art museum in Manhattan, New York

- Established: 1956
- Location: 2 Columbus Circle; Manhattan, New York City
- Coordinates: 40°46′3″N 73°58′55″W
- Type: Art museum
- Curator: Elissa Auther
- Public transit access: Bus: M5, M7, M2, M31, M57, M104; Subway: at 59th Street–Columbus Circle
- Website: www.madmuseum.org

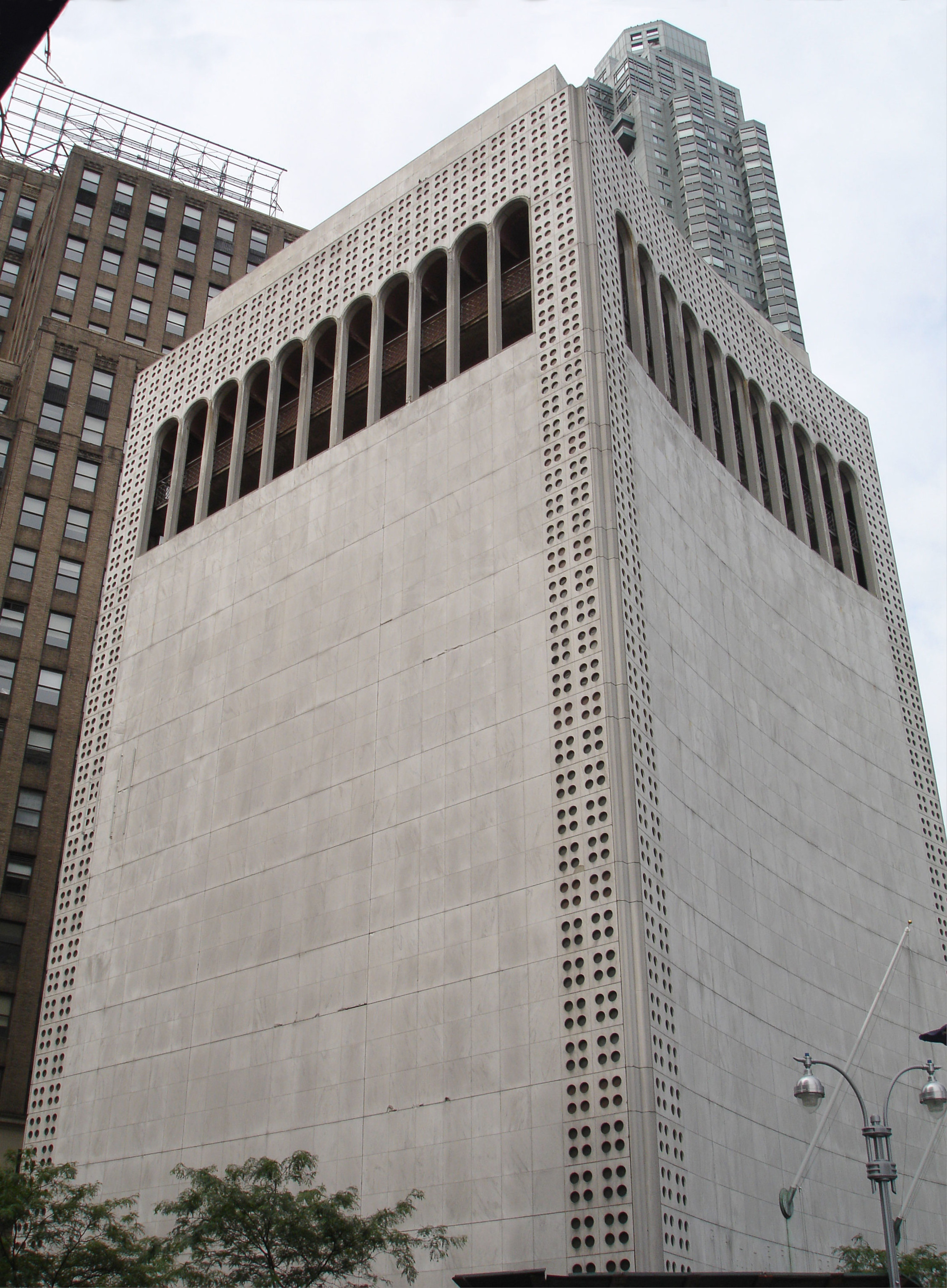
The original design of the Edward Durell Stone building at 2 Columbus Circle

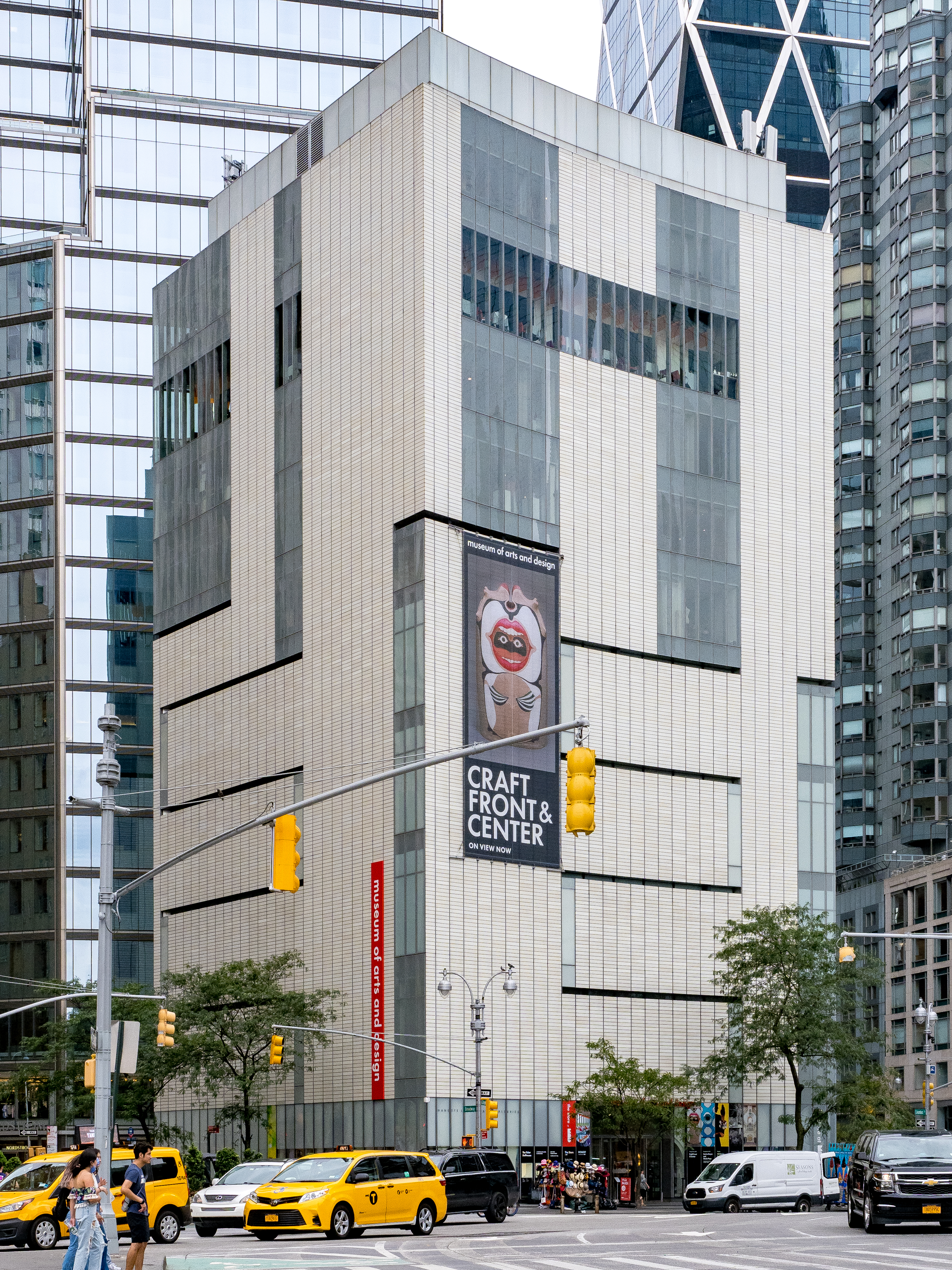
The Museum of Arts and Design in 2021

The Museum of Arts and Design (MAD), based in Manhattan, New York City, collects, displays, and interprets objects that document contemporary and historic innovation in craft, art, and design. In its exhibitions and educational programs, the museum celebrates the creative process through which materials are crafted into works that enhance contemporary life.

== History ==
The museum first opened its doors in 1956 as the Museum of Contemporary Crafts, with an original mission of recognizing the craftsmanship of contemporary American artists. Nurtured by the vision of philanthropist and craft patron Aileen Osborn Webb, the museum mounted exhibitions that focused on the materials and techniques associated with craft disciplines. From its earliest years, the museum celebrated the changing roles of craftsmanship in society, served as an important advocate for emerging artists, and linked art to industry.

From 1963 to 1987, under the directorship of Paul J. Smith, the museum presented dynamic and often participatory exhibitions that reflected the social currents of the era and broke down hierarchies in the arts with the celebration of popular culture and mundane materials. In 1979, the museum reopened as the American Craft Museum in an expanded location at 44 West 53rd Street. To accommodate its ever-growing programming, the museum relocated again in 1986 to its 18,000-square-foot home at 40 West 53rd Street, where it would remain until 2008.

The next ten years were a period of rapid growth and change, as the American Craft Council was restructured and the museum and the council were established as independent organizations. Holly Hotchner was appointed as director of the museum in 1996, and served as director for 16 years until 2013. Hotchner initiated a comprehensive strategic planning process that expanded the Board of Trustees, curatorial staff, and exhibition and educational program. This process led to the museum's name change, in 2002, to the Museum of Arts and Design to reflect the institution's increasingly interdisciplinary collections and programming. The continued growth of MAD's collections, public programs, and attendance resulted in its successful 2002 bid to the New York City Economic Development Corporation to acquire the building at 2 Columbus Circle.

The museum opened in its new home at 2 Columbus Circle to great controversy. The proposed changes to the building originally designed by Edward Durell Stone sparked a preservation debate joined by Tom Wolfe (The New York Times; October 12, 2003 and October 13, 2003), Chuck Close, Frank Stella, Robert A. M. Stern, Columbia art history department chairman Barry Bergdoll, New York Times architecture critics Herbert Muschamp and Nicolai Ouroussoff, urbanist scholar Witold Rybczynski, among others. Congresswoman Carolyn B. Maloney (D-NY) referred to it as "one of New York's most photographed and readily recognizable buildings."

The new building was designed by Brad Cloepfil of Allied Works Architecture, in September 2008. With its textured façade of glazed terra-cotta tile and fritted glass, the Jerome and Simona Chazen Building reflects MAD's craft heritage and permanent collections.

From 2013 to 2021, MAD had eleven directors, including six interim directors; this was an unusually high turnover rate compared to the directorships of other museums. In September 2013, Dr. Glenn Adamson was appointed as the museum's new Nanette L. Laitman Director. Previously a vocal critic of the museum, Adamson was characterized as a "bold choice" by the trustees. After a tenure of just over two years, Adamson stepped down from the post. The next permanent director was Jorge Daniel Veneciano, who was appointed in August 2016 and resigned after only five months. Chris Scoates was appointed director of the museum in March 2018 and stepped down in August 2020. Timothy R. Rodgers became MAD's director in 2021.

== 2 Columbus Circle location ==
The new location at 2 Columbus Circle, with more than 54,000 square feet (5,000 m^{2}), more than tripled the size of the museum's former space. It includes four floors of exhibition galleries for works by established and emerging artists; a 150-seat auditorium in which the museum plans to feature lectures, films, and performances; and a restaurant. It also includes a Center for the Study of Jewelry, and an Education Center that offers multi-media access to primary source material, hands-on classrooms for students, and three artists-in-residence studios.

== See also ==
- List of design museums
- American craft
- Paul J. Smith (arts administrator), Director emeritus
- Lowery Stokes Sims, Curator emerita
- Ursula Ilse-Neuman, Curator emerita
- Shannon R. Stratton, former William and Mildred Lasdon Chief Curator
