= Glenn Adamson =

American curator, author, and historian

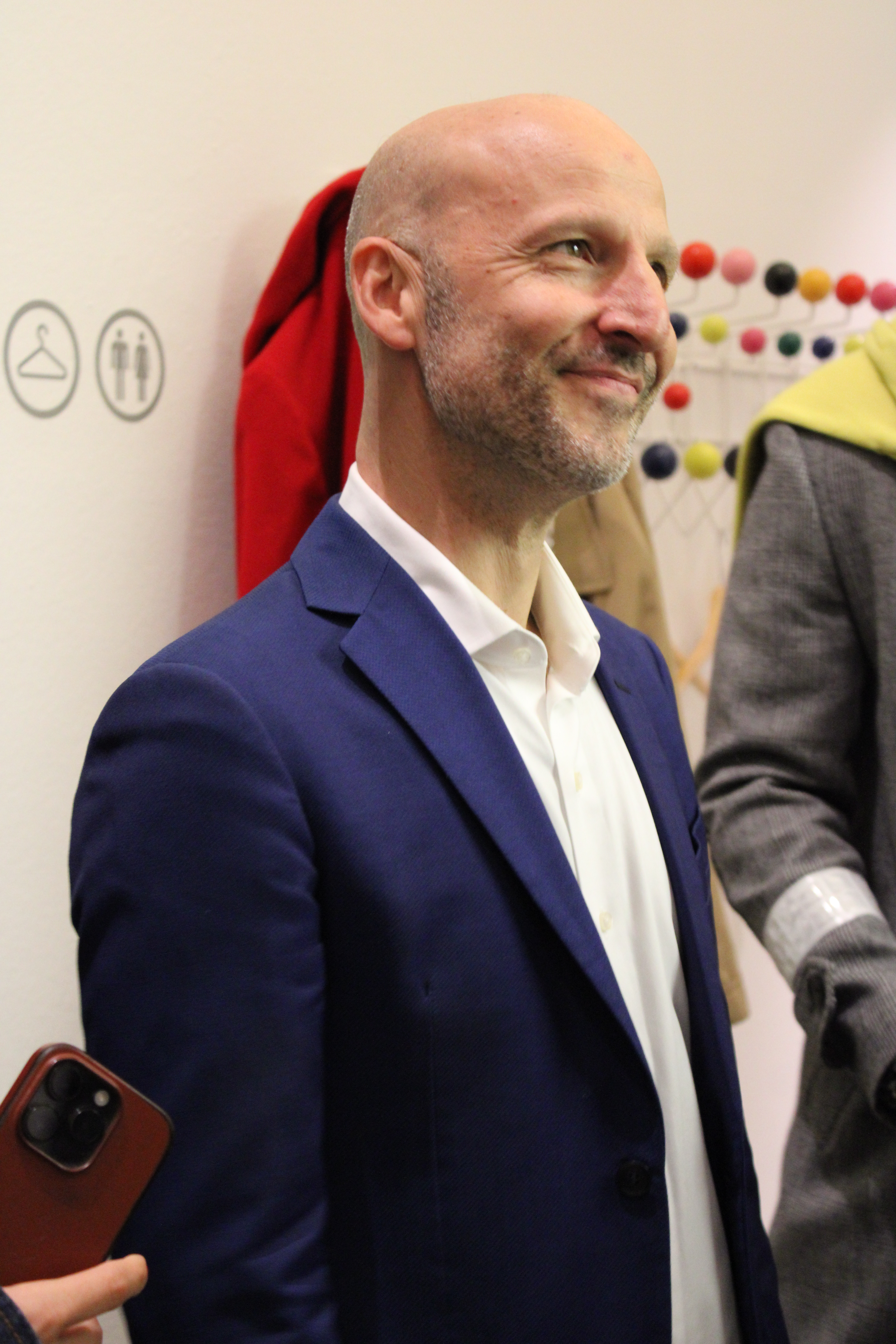
- Adamson at the Vitra Design Museum in 2024
- Born: August 10, 1972 (age 54)
- Education: Cornell University; Yale University
- Occupations: Curator; Historian; Writer
- Relatives: Peter Adamson (twin brother)

Glenn Adamson (born 1972) is an American curator, author, and historian whose work focuses on design, craft, and contemporary art. He has been director of the Museum of Arts and Design, head of research at the Victoria and Albert Museum, and a curator at the Chipstone Foundation.

He is Curator at Large at the Vitra Design Museum, Artistic Director of Design Doha, a founding editor of Journal of Modern Craft, and since 2024, the curatorial director of Design Miami.

== Early life and education ==
Glenn Adamson was born in 1972 and raised in Boston, Massachusetts, along with his identical twin brother Peter Adamson. He earned his B.A. in History of Art from Cornell University in 1994 and his PhD in Art History from Yale University in 2001.

== Museum and curatorial work ==
=== Museum of Arts and Design ===
From 2013 to 2016 Glenn Adamson served as the Nanette L. Laitman Director of the Museum of Arts and Design in New York. In 2016, when he stepped down from his post as Director at the Museum of Arts and Design, the museum stated:

"During his tenure, Dr. Adamson led the institution through a period of significant growth of its programming and resources, and built a new leadership team. Dr. Adamson spearheaded an exhibitions program that explored and expanded MAD's unique mission and role in the arts ecology of New York and the nation, including NYC Makers: The MAD Biennial; Ralph Pucci: The Art of the Mannequin; Pathmakers: Women in Art, Craft, and Design, Midcentury and Today; Wendell Castle Remastered; Studio Job: MAD HOUSE; and Voulkos: The Breakthrough Years. Dr. Adamson created the position of Windgate Research Curator, in collaboration with the Bard Graduate Center, to further enhance the scholarship of MAD's publications and exhibitions. He also expanded MAD's noted artist-in-residence program by engaging younger artists from traditionally under-represented communities, through an initiative funded by a grant from The New York Community Trust."

=== Victoria and Albert Museum ===
From 2005 to 2013 Glenn Adamson served as the head of research at the Victoria and Albert Museum. During his time there, Adamson published several books and essays, as well as co-curated the exhibition Postmodernism: Style and Subversion 1970–1990 along with Jane Pavitt. Adamson was also a key proponent in initiating the "Rapid Response Unit" of the V&A, where contemporary objects like 3D printed guns and "pussy hats" are added to the museum's collection quickly in direct response to contemporary culture.

=== Chipstone Foundation ===
Glenn Adamson served as curator for the Chipstone Foundation from 2000 to 2005. The Chipstone Foundation focuses on the study, preservation, and championing of American material culture with heavy emphases on the decorative arts. This mission can be seen reflected in Adamson's work there, where he curated such historically American focused exhibitions as Skin Deep: Three Masters of American Inlay and Tea Table Coffee Table. In addition to his curatorial work, Adamson also made regular contributions to the Chipstone's journals American Furniture and Ceramics in America.

=== Design Miami ===
Adamson is the curatorial director of Design Miami.

=== Guest curatorial work ===
- 2003 Industrial Strength Design: How Brooks Stevens Shaped Your World, Milwaukee Art Museum, Milwaukee, WI
- 2013 fix fix fix, Gallery SO, London, UK
- 2017 Things of Beauty Growing: British Studio Pottery (co-curated with Martina Droth and Simon Olding), Yale Center for British Art, New Haven, CT
- 2017 Static, Friedman Benda Gallery, New York City, NY
- 2017 Beazley Designs of the Year, Design Museum, London, UK
- 2018 Raw Design, Museum of Craft and Design, San Francisco, CA
- 2021 Crafting America, Crystal Bridges Museum of American Art, Bentonville, Arkansas
- 2023 Mirror Mirror: Reflections on Design at Chatsworth House, UK
- 2024 The New Transcendence, Friedman Benda Gallery, NY
- 2024 Toshiko Takaezu: Worlds Within (co-curated with Kate Weiner and Leilehua Lanzilotti), The Noguchi Museum, Long Island City, New York
- 2024 Nike: Form Follows Motion, Vitra Design Museum, Weil am Rhein, Germany

== Selected publications ==
=== Books ===
- A Century of Tomorrows (Bloomsbury, 2024)
- Craft: An American History (Bloomsbury, 2021)
- Fewer Better Things: The Hidden Wisdom of Objects (Bloomsbury, 2018)
- The Invention of Craft (Bloomsbury, 2013)
- The Craft Reader (Berg, 2010)
- Thinking Through Craft (Berg, 2007)
- Industrial Strength Design: How Brooks Stevens Shaped Your World (MIT Press, 2003)

=== Book collaborations ===
- Creating Ourselves: The Self in Art (Whitechapel Gallery, 2017) (co-authored with Frances Borzello, Nicholas Cullinan, and Amelia Jones)
- Art in the Making: Artists and Their Materials from the Studio to Crowdsourcing (Thames & Hudson, 2016) (co-authored with Julia Bryan-Wilson)
- Things of Beauty Growing: British Studio Pottery (Yale University Press, 2016) (co-edited with Martina Droth, and Simon Olding)
- Peter Voulkos: The Breakthrough Years (Black Dog Publishing, 2016) (co-authored with Elissa Auther, Barbara Paris Gifford, Jim Melchert, Ruby Neri, Andrew Perchuk, and Jenni Sorkin)
- Paul Evans: Crossing Boundaries and Crafting Modernism (Arnoldsche, 2014) (co-authored with Edward S. Cooke, Jr., Helen W. Drutt English, Robert Slifkin, and Gregory Wittkopp)
- Surface tensions: Surface, finish and the meaning of objects (Manchester University Press, 2013) (co-edited with Victoria Kelley)
- Global Design History (Routledge, 2011) (co-edited with Giorgio Riello and Sarah Teasley)
- Postmodernism: Style and Subversion (V & A Publishing, 2011) (co-edited with Jane Pavitt)
- Hand + Made: The Performative Impulse in Art and Craft (Contemporary Arts Museum, Houston, 2010) (co-authored with Valerie Cassel Oliver and Namita Wiggers)
- Unpacking the Collection: Selections from the Museum of Contemporary Craft (Museum of Contemporary Craft, 2010) (co-authored with Janet Koplos and Namita Wiggers)

=== Articles and essays ===
- Sculpture: An Art of Craft and Storytelling (Art in America, 2022)
- How Sheila Hicks Changed the Way We Think About Sculpture (Frieze, 2019)
- Gloria Kisch: A Career at the Crossroads of Art and Design (Frieze, 2019)
- Midlife Crisis on an Unlimited Budget: Marc Newson’s Furniture for the 1% (Frieze, 2019)
- A Young Designer's Pulpy and Surprisingly Personal Furniture (Hyperallergic, 2018)
- Katherine Westphal, Fiber Art Pioneer, Dies at 99 (Hyperallergic, 2018)
- A Shrewd Designer Balances Craft and Commerce (Hyperallergic, 2018)
- Great Estates: How Contemporary Ceramics Are Keeping Chatsworth Relevant (Frieze, 2018)
- Fallen Idylls (The Magazine Antiques, 2018)
- The Future Starts Here: Jes Fan (Crafts Magazine, 2018)
- The Seamless Weaving of Fine Arts with Crafts (Hyperallergic, 2017)
- Weaving Together the Story of a Forgotten Pop Artist and Her Rugs (Hyperallergic, 2017)
- Normal Design (Art in America, 2017)
- Silver Spoons (Frieze, 2017)
- The Complexity Complex (Frieze, 2017)
- Demo Job: Craft, Art, and the Politics of Demonstration (Art Jewelry Forum, 2016)
- Summer Work: The Art of Pae White (Afterall, 2013)
- Issues & Commentary: Tsunami Africa (Art in America, 2011)
- The American Arcanum: Porcelain and the Alchemical Tradition (Ceramics in America, 2007)
- Mannerism in Early American Furniture: Connoisseurship, Intention, and Theatricality (American Furniture, 2005)
- The Politics of the Caned Chair (American Furniture, 2002)
- The Furniture of Sam Maloof (American Furniture, 2002)

=== The Journal of Modern Craft ===
The Journal of Modern Craft (first launched in 2008) is a peer reviewed academic journal focused on interdisciplinary writings on the topics of design, craft, art, architecture, and related fields. The journal is published by Taylor & Francis, and releases three issues a year. The editorial board consists of Glenn Adamson (USA); Tanya Harrod, Independent Scholar (UK); Edward S. Cooke Jr., Yale University (USA); Stephen Knott, Kingston University (UK); Elissa Auther, Windgate Research Curator, Bard Graduate Center and Center for Craft, Creativity and Design (USA); Jenni Sorkin, University of California (USA). The journal is funded in part by the Windgate Charitable Foundation and The Center for Craft, Creativity & Design, with Joseph McBrinn, University of Ulster (UK) as the Book Review Editor, and Namita Wiggers, Museum of Contemporary Craft (USA) as the Exhibition Review Editor.

== Personal life ==
Adamson is currently based in London and New York.
