= Jacob S. Lasdon =

American pharmaceutical executive and philanthropist

- Born: 1895
- Died: March 3, 1971 (age 71)
- Occupation(s): Pharmaceutical executive Philanthropist
- Known for: Warner-Lambert, The Lasdon Foundation
- Family: Lasdon

Jacob S. Lasdon (1895 – March 3, 1971) was an American pharmaceutical executive and philanthropist. Along with his brothers, he was an officer and director of Warner-Lambert and a founder trustee of the Lasdon Foundation, which was created in 1946.

== Early life and education ==
Jacob S. Lasdon was brought to the United States from the Russian Empire as an infant and educated in the public schools of Brooklyn, New York. He had six younger siblings, including brothers William S. Lasdon, Philip S. Lasdon, Milton Lasdon, and Stanley S. Lasdon and sisters Francis Milch and Miriam Gerrity.

== Career ==
Lasdon went into the pharmaceutical business with his younger brothers. He was an officer and director of the Pyridium Corporation and of its successor, the Nepera Chemical Company, a manufacturer of prescription drugs. One of Nepera's units was the Anahist Company, formed to market Anahist, an over-the-counter preparation for colds. In 1956 the Lasdon's Nepera Chemical, including the Anahist unit, was acquired by Warner-Lambert, which was itself later acquired by Pfizer.

As treasurer of the Lasdon Foundation, Jacob Lasdon was instrumental in its establishment of the Lasdon Colonnade at Lincoln Center, the Lasdon Clinic for Physical Medicine at New York Hospital, and many programs in medical research. A piano student in his youth, Lasdon's philanthropy further included assistance to many promising young musical artists. Lasdon was also a substantial contributor to the Jewish Theological Seminary, from which he received the Louis Marshall Award in 1969.

== Personal life ==
Lasdon made his home at The Pierre in New York City. He was survived by his siblings and their children. His niece was prominent arts philanthropist Nanette L. Laitman. The Lasdon family's country estate is now the Lasdon Park and Arboretum.
