= Mario Amaya =

American art critic, museum director and magazine editor (1933–1986)

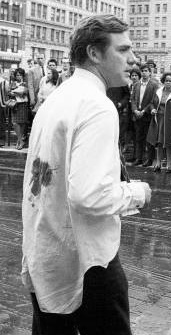
- Amaya in 1968
- Born: October 6, 1933; Brooklyn, New York, U.S.
- Died: June 29, 1986 (aged 52); London, England
- Occupations: American art critic, museum director, magazine editor
- Known for: Directing the New York Cultural Center (1972–1976); Founding editor of Art and Artists magazine

Mario Amaya (October 6, 1933 – June 29, 1986) was an American art critic, magazine editor, and museum director. He played a significant role in shaping contemporary art discourse in the United States and Europe. Known for his energetic and eclectic approach, he led major institutions including the New York Cultural Center and the Chrysler Museum of Art, and authored influential early studies of Pop art and decorative arts. He was also the chief curator of the Art Gallery of Ontario and the founding editor of London's Art and Artists magazine.

== Biography ==
Mario Amaya was born in Brooklyn, New York, to Cuban immigrants Mario Amaya and Maria Garofalo. He studied under painters Mark Rothko and Ad Reinhardt at Brooklyn College before relocating to England in 1958, where he became assistant editor of the Royal Opera House magazine About the House (1962–1968) and founding editor of Art and Artists (1965–1968). In 1968, he organized The Obsessive Image, inaugurating the Institute of Contemporary Arts' new premises in London.

Amaya established himself as a leading voice in postwar art criticism with publications such as Pop as Art (1965), Art Nouveau (1966), and Tiffany Glass (1967), each contributing to a broader reassessment of modern and decorative arts.

In June 1968, he was present at Pop artist Andy Warhol's studio, the Factory, when Warhol was critically wounded in a shooting by Valerie Solanas; Amaya himself sustained a minor injury. Amaya, then a journalist, was visiting New York from his base in London and was waiting to interview Warhol. He later wrote, "It was like a Magritte painting for me, with everything so real and yet so totally unreal at the same time."

He went on to a prominent museum career, serving as chief curator of the Art Gallery of Ontario (1969–1972), where he organized major exhibitions, including the first North American survey of late 19th-century Symbolist art and a retrospective of painter Édouard Vuillard. As director of the New York Cultural Center (1972–1976), he helped "strengthen the Cultural Center's position as one of the liveliest of New York's museums" at the time. He transformed the institution into a multidisciplinary venue, presenting exhibitions such as Realism Now (1972), Blacks: U.S.A. (1973), Women Choose Women (1973), Bouguereau (organized with Robert Isaacson, 1975), a retrospective of visual artist Man Ray (1975), and a survey of theater director Max Reinhardt. He later served as director of the Chrysler Museum of Art in Norfolk, Virginia (1976–1979).

Amaya also contributed to art magazines such as Studio International and Art in America, and served as a visiting professor at the State University of New York at Buffalo. At one point, Amaya was engaged in research for a proposed biography of photojournalist Lee Miller (with which she co-operated), but the project did not materialize. He interviewed Miller for the May/June 1975 issue of Art in America. He interviewed art collector Peggy Guggenheim for the December 1979 issue of Warhol's Interview magazine.

Amaya was noted for his charisma, curatorial ambition, and ability to engage broad audiences with contemporary art. He was a close friend of chemist and art collector Stuart Pivar, who credited Amaya with teaching him everything about art.

Amaya died from AIDS-related cancer at Charing Cross Hospital in London on June 29, 1986. He was survived by his mother, who lived in Brooklyn.
