= William S. Lasdon =

American pharmaceutical executive and philanthropist

- Born: 1896; Brooklyn, New York
- Died: December 9, 1984 (age 88)
- Occupation(s): Pharmaceutical executive Philanthropist
- Known for: Warner-Lambert, The Lasdon Foundation
- Spouse: Mildred D. Silverman
- Children: 2
- Family: Lasdon

William S. Lasdon (1896 – December 9, 1984) was an American pharmaceutical executive and philanthropist.

== Early life ==
William S. Lasdon was born to a Jewish family in Brooklyn, New York in 1896. He was one of seven children including brothers Jacob S. Lasdon, Philip S. Lasdon, Milton Lasdon, Stanley S. Lasdon, and sisters Mrs. Francis Milch and Mrs. Miriam Gerrity.

== Philanthropy ==
Lasdon was president of the eponymous foundation which he and his family formed in 1946. The Lasdon Foundation and subsequent generations of family trusts have been major supporters of medical research and the arts in New York. Lasdon was also a member of the board of overseers of the Albert Einstein College of Medicine and a director of the Cerebral Palsy Association and the Boys Clubs of America.

== Personal life ==
Lasdon married Mildred D. Silverman in 1922 and had a son Robert Lasdon and a daughter, philanthropist Nanette L. Laitman. Their former country estate is now the Lasdon Park and Arboretum.
