= Building at 44 Central Avenue =

Historic commercial building in New York, United States

- U.S. National Register of Historic Places
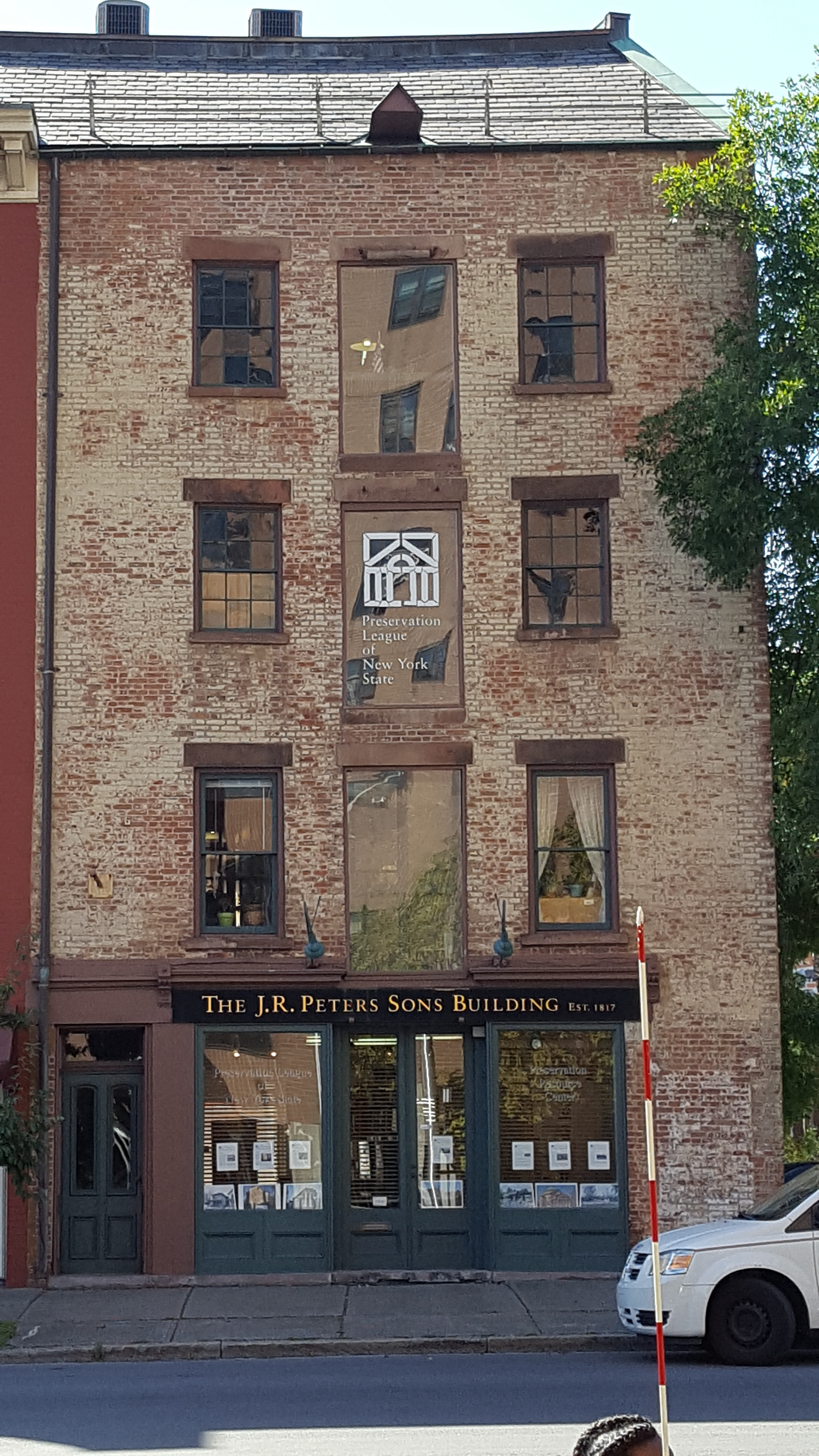

- Location within New York Location within the United States
- Location: 44 Central Avenue, Albany, New York
- Coordinates: 42°39′30″N 73°46′04″W
- Area: 0.2 acres (0.081 ha)
- Built: c. 1817
- Architectural style: Early Republic
- NRHP reference No.: 14000002
- Added to NRHP: February 14, 2014

44 Central Avenue (also known as J.R. Peter's and Sons) is a historic commercial building located in the Washington Avenue neighborhood of Albany, Albany County, New York.

== Description and history ==
It was built sometime between June 23, 1813 and 1817 at a prominent intersection known as Robinson's Point, and is a three-story, load bearing brick wedge-shaped building with the bricks on the exterior laid in a Flemish bond pattern. It sits on an uncoursed rubble foundation and has a full basement. The building housed a grain and feed storage and sales company until 1941. In 1983 the building underwent major rehabilitations, and is currently occupied by the Preservation League of New York State.

It was listed on the National Register of Historic Places on February 14, 2014.
