= Brad Cloepfil =

American architect and educator (born 1956)

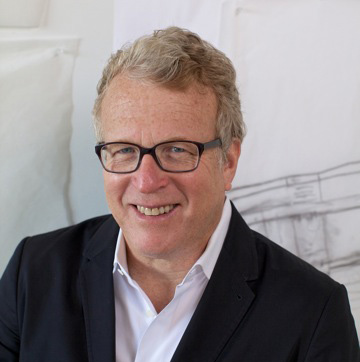
- Cloepfil, November 2012
- Born: 1956 (age 69–70); Portland, Oregon, U.S.
- Education: University of Oregon; Columbia University
- Occupation: Architect
- Practice: Allied Works Architecture

Brad Cloepfil (born 1956) is an American architect, educator and principal of Allied Works Architecture of Portland, Oregon, and New York City. His first major project was an adaptive reuse of a Portland warehouse for the advertising agency Wieden+Kennedy. Since 2000, Cloepfil and Allied Works have completed cultural, commercial and residential projects including the Contemporary Art Museum St. Louis, the University of Michigan Museum of Art, the Dutchess County Residence Guest House and the Museum of Arts and Design. Recent works include the National Music Centre of Canada in Calgary, Alberta, which opened in July 2016; the Providence Park expansion in Portland, Oregon, completed in 2019; and the Palmer Museum of Art in State College, Pennsylvania, completed in 2024.

== Early life and education ==
Cloepfil was born in Portland, Oregon and earned his Bachelor of Architecture at the University of Oregon in Eugene. After working in the offices of Skidmore, Owings & Merrill, in Los Angeles, and Mario Botta, in Switzerland, Cloepfil moved to New York to earn his advanced degree in architectural design. He received his Master of Science in Advanced Architectural Design from the Columbia University Graduate School of Architecture in 1985.

== Career ==
After a decade of teaching and practice in New York, California and Oregon, Cloepfil founded Allied Works Architecture in Portland, Oregon, in 1994, and opened the New York City office in 2003. Cloepfil has designed and realized a wide range of projects around the world, including civic and educational institutions, arts organizations and museums, and private residences.

== Projects ==
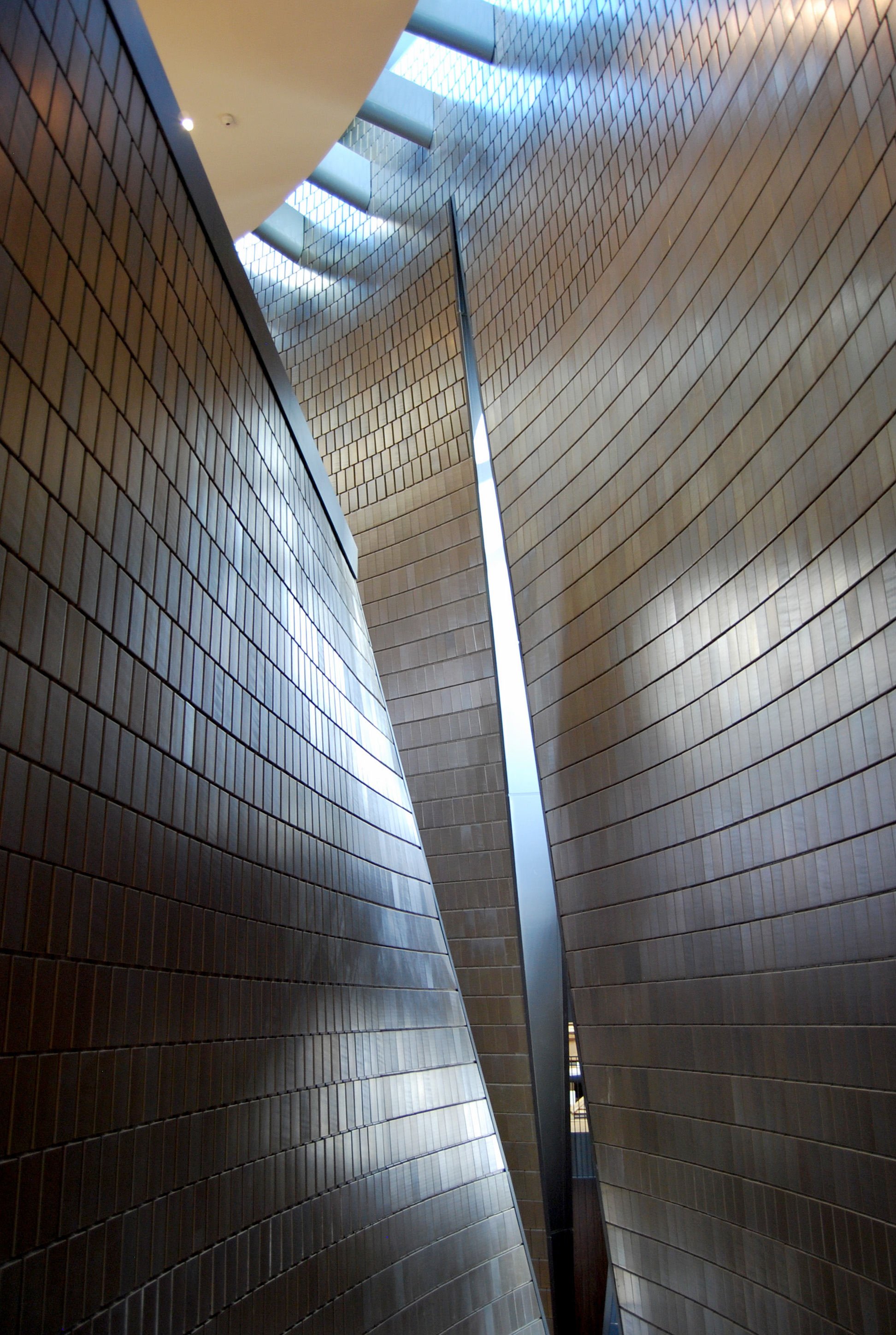
Interior construction photo of the National Music Centre of Canada, Calgary, Alberta. Architect: Brad Cloepfil / Allied Works Architecture

=== Wieden+Kennedy Building ===
Allied Works' first major commission for the Wieden+Kennedy Building was awarded after the co-founder Dan Wieden sought out the designer of a local Portland bar called Saucebox, which was one of Cloepfil's early tight-budget projects. The project converted an abandoned 1908 warehouse into the headquarters for an international advertising agency. In a state of disrepair after decades as a sealed cold-storage facility, Wieden had doubts of ever occupying the building, but Cloepfil convinced him that it was worth the effort. The Allied Works design brought natural light into the dark warehouse, transforming it into an open structure with new concrete and reclaimed Douglas-fir juxtaposed against the existing masonry and heavy timber frame. This project earned him several other projects from Wieden and was instrumental in further commissions.

=== Contemporary Art Museum Saint Louis ===
Cloepfil's firm was selected in a 1999 design competition for the Contemporary Art Museum St. Louis over world-renowned architects such as Peter Zumthor, Herzog & de Meuron, and Rem Koolhaas. The museum was sited next to an existing Tadao Ando building for the Pulitzer Foundation and completed in 2003. The program of the museum was open-ended in the model of European Kunsthalls and does not own a collection. Describing his approach, Cloepfil said "I wanted a space that is energized on its own terms but also would be inspirational for artists. In a non-collecting context, you hope that artists are intensely motivated to generate work for the space."

=== Seattle Art Museum expansion ===
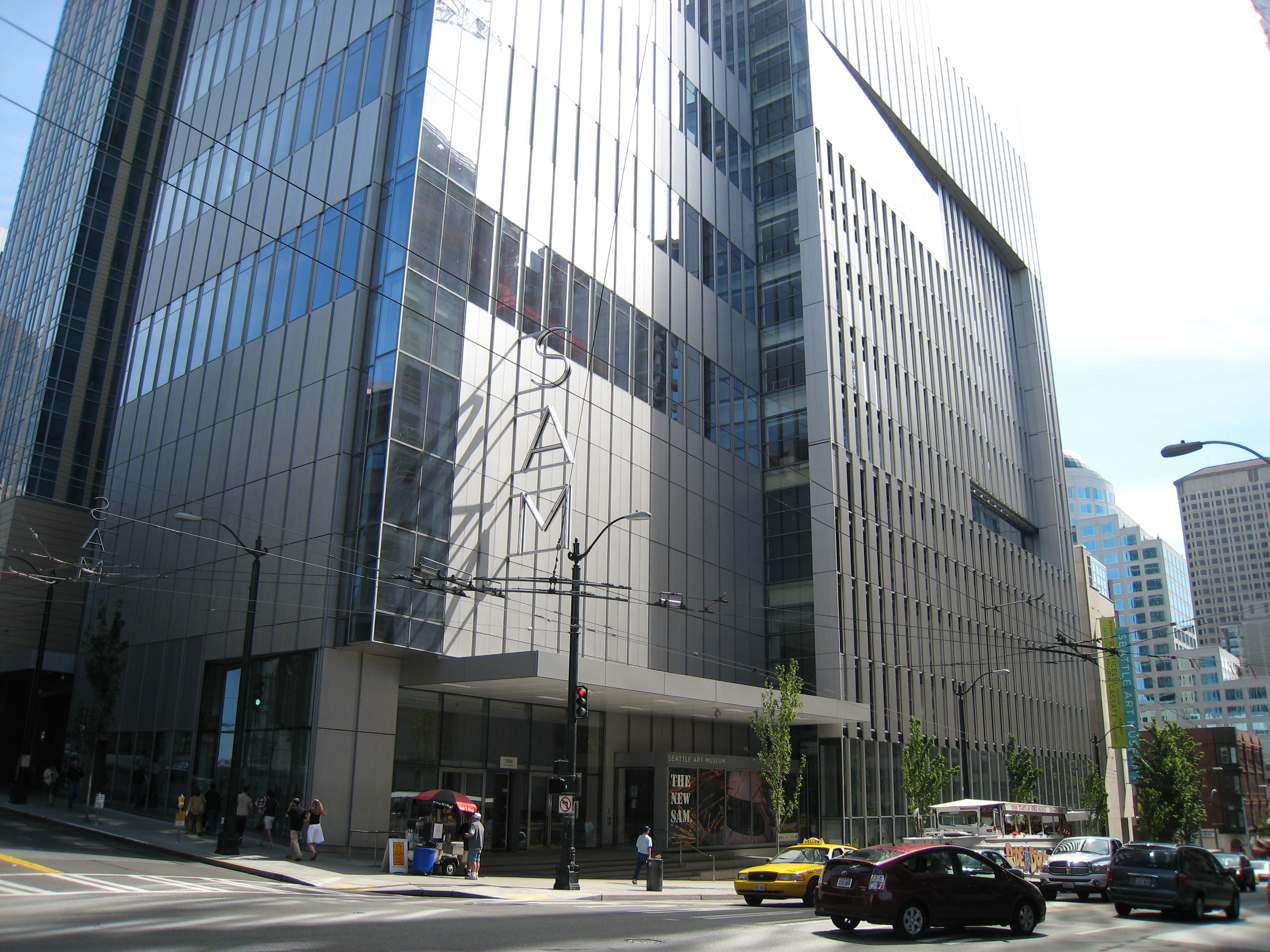
Seattle Art Museum expansion

When the Seattle Art Museum expansion committee was seeking an architect, Terry Riley — the chief curator of architecture and design at the Museum of Modern art in New York — suggested that they consider Brad Cloepfil based on the work done on Wieden+Kennedy. In 2002, the Seattle Art Museum selected Allied Works for the expansion project, which more than doubled the museum's space, accommodated Robert Venturi's original design in 1991, and also included offices for Washington Mutual until the museum expands again. Allied Works was selected over other finalists Polshek Partnership and Cooper, Robertson & Partners.

=== Museum of Arts and Design ===
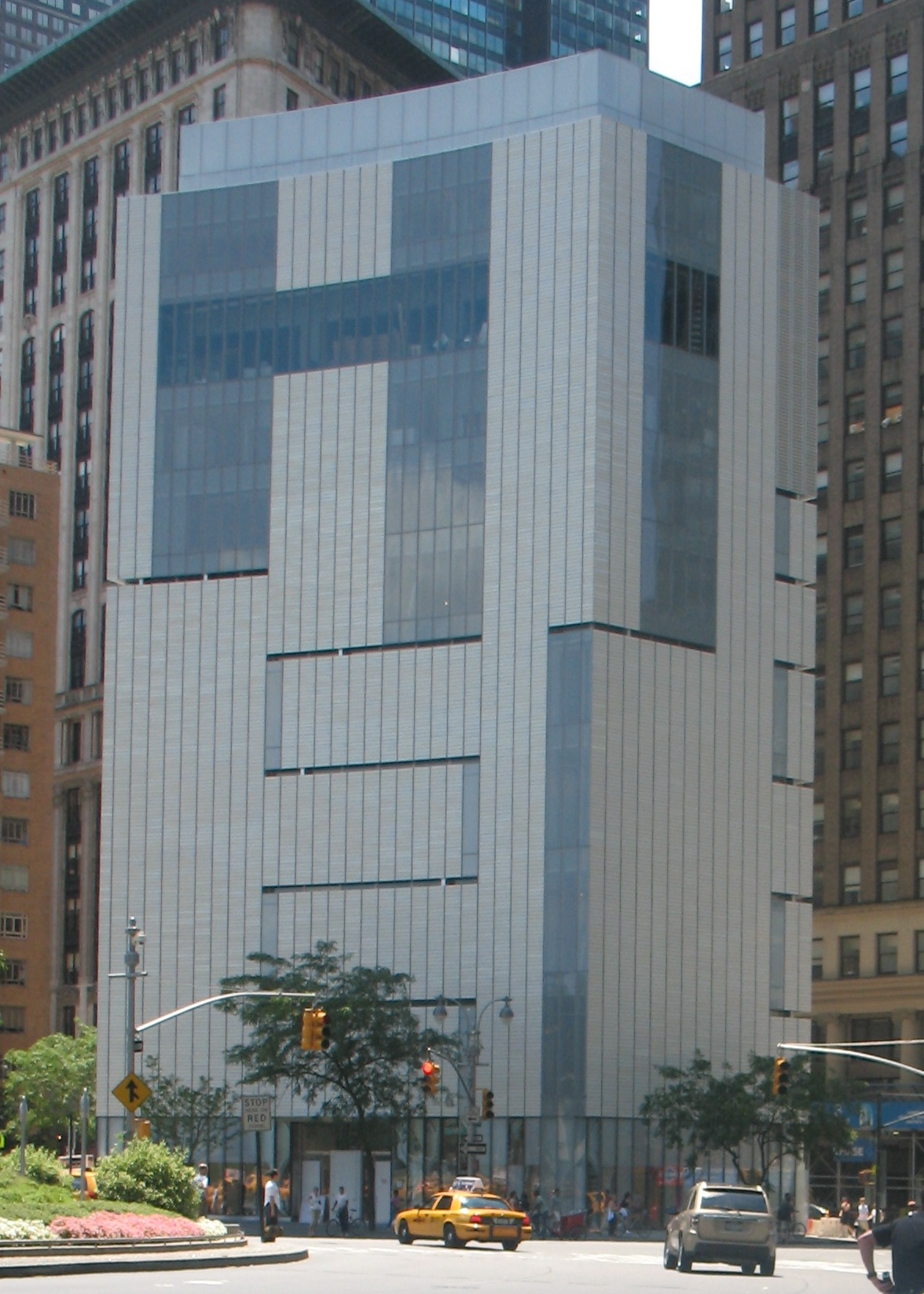
Museum of Arts & Design at 2 Columbus Circle, nearly completed in July 2008. A piece by David Dunlap's in the NY Times reveals that the appearance of the letter "H" was an owner driven design change.

Also in 2002, Cloepfil won the redesign of Edward Durell Stone's 2 Columbus Circle for the Museum of Arts and Design over architects Zaha Hadid, Toshiko Mori Architects, and Smith-Miller & Hawkinson Architects. Interest in landmarking this building began in 1996, soon after the building turned thirty years old and became eligible for landmark designation. In this year, Robert A. M. Stern included it in his article "A Preservationist's List of 35 Modern Landmarks-in-Waiting" written for The New York Times.

When the building was vacated by the NYC Convention and Visitors Bureau in 1998 it was neglected, and remained unoccupied until the right to redevelop the building was awarded to the American Craft Museum (now known as the Museum of Arts and Design). Years later, plans to alter the building were called the erasure "of a rare American modernist."

Cloepfil used the same massing and geometric shape as dictated by the city zoning regulations, and carved channels into the structure to bring in natural light. The redesigned building replaced the original white Vermont Marble with a glazed terra-cotta and glass facade. The aim behind the design was to underline the iconic presence of this 10-storey building and respond to the needs of the institution that will occupy it. The terra-cotta and glass covering evokes the principal theme of the collection, a look at different traditions in contemporary craft practice. The tiles were developed in collaboration with Dutch ceramics company Royal Tichelaar Makkum with a custom glaze by artist Christine Jetten.

The redesign of 2 Columbus Circle generated considerable attention and debate within the local community and architectural press, including opinion pieces written by Nicolai Ouroussoff, Ada Louise Huxtable, Paul Goldberger, Witold Rybczynski, Justin Gardener and Justin Davidson.

=== Clyfford Still Museum ===
In 2007, Cloepfil and Allied Works won the competition to design the Clyfford Still Museum, which is adjacent to Daniel Libeskind's design of the Denver Art Museum. The museum opened to the public in 2011. The lower-level houses the education, archive and storage spaces. In the upper level galleries, the visitor moves through a series of nine distinct volumes where they encounter the work of Clyfford Still. The galleries respond to the evolving character of Still's art, changing scale and proportion, while varying the intensity of light.

=== Case Work Exhibition ===
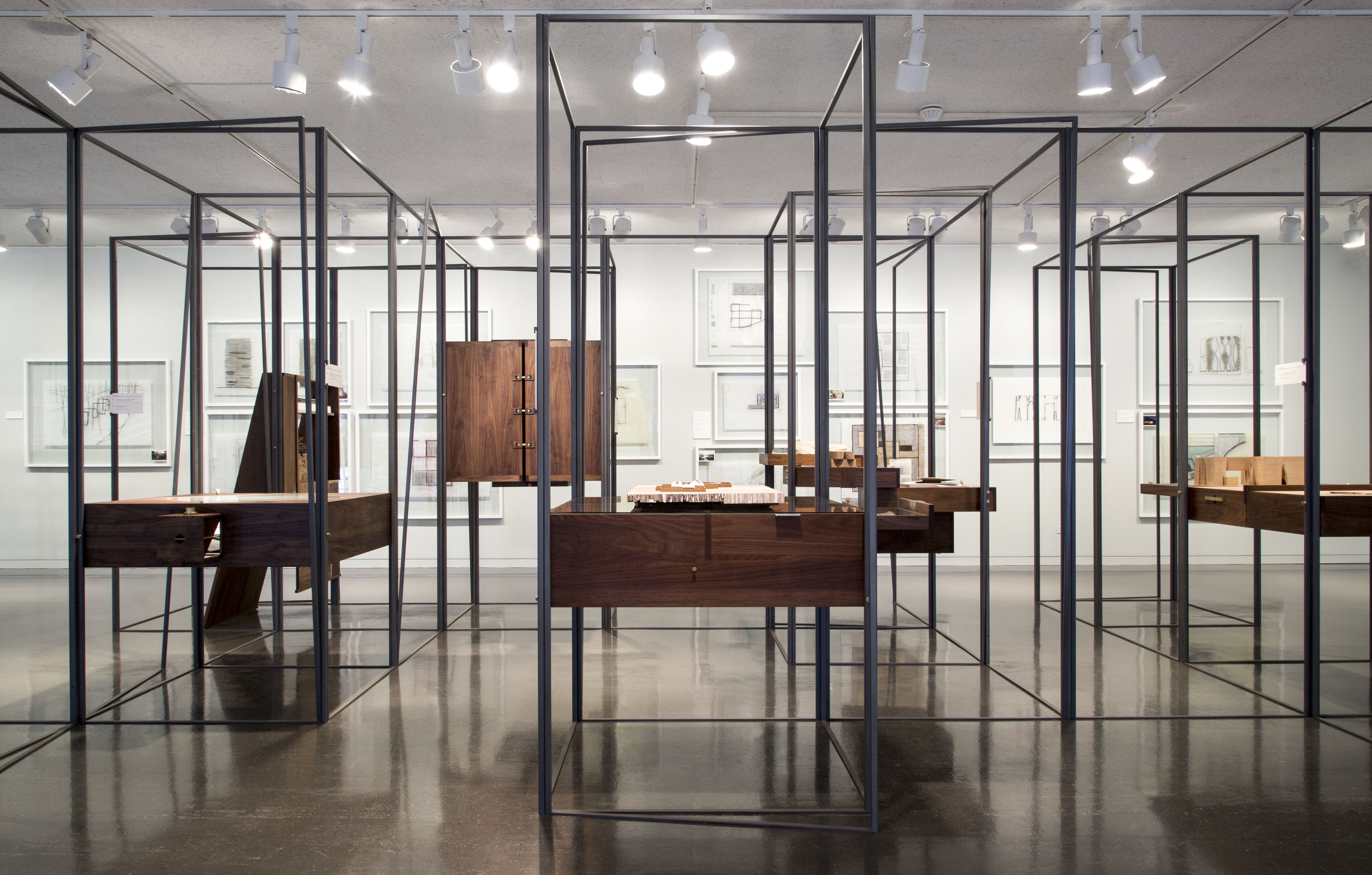
Case Work: Studies in Form, Space and Construction at the Denver Art Museum, 2016

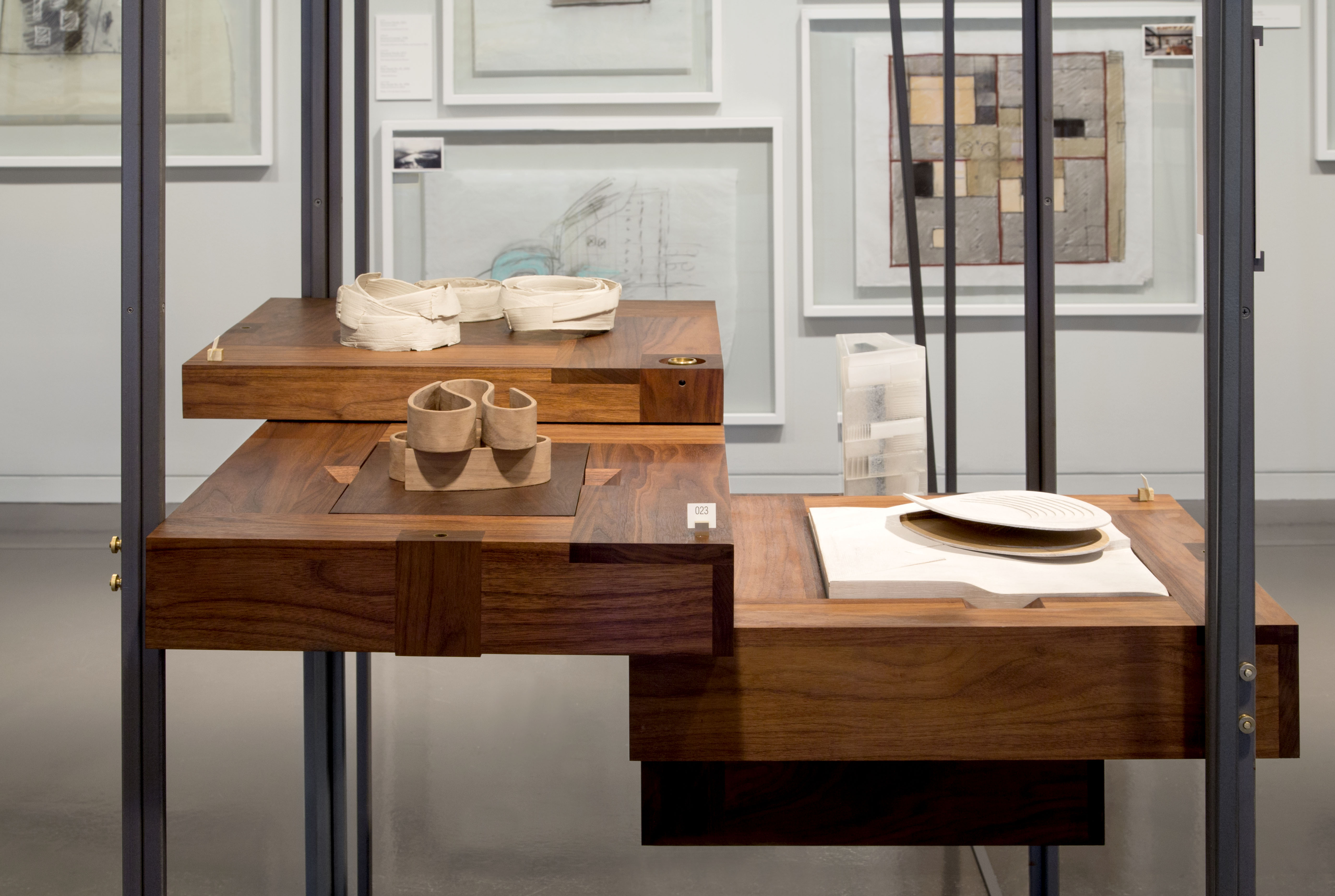
Case Work: Studies in Form, Space and Construction at the Denver Art Museum, 2016

In 2016, the Denver Art Museum hosted a temporary exhibit called "Case Work: Studies in Form, Space & Construction", which showcased the design process used for the neighboring Clyfford Still Museum and other major works by Allied and Cloepfil. After Denver, the exhibit is planned to show at the Portland Art Museum and then embark on a two-year international tour. Dean Sobel, director of the Clyfford Still Museum, is curator of the exhibit. In Portland, "Case Work" will be on view from June 4 through September 4, 2016.
