= Nanette L. Laitman =

American art collector and philanthropist (1924–2020)

- Born: 1924; New York City, New York, USA
- Died: March 23, 2020
- Occupation: Philanthropist

Nanette L. Laitman (born 1924, New York City - March 23, 2020) was an art collector and philanthropist. She has been involved with the board of the Museum of Arts and Design (MAD) and its precursors in New York City for over 25 years. She became a member of the board in 1994 and board president in 2000. She was one of the main benefactors supporting MAD's relocation to 2 Columbus Circle in 2002. Laitman has also funded the Nanette Laitman Documentation Project for Craft and Decorative Arts in America at the Smithsonian's Archives of American Art.

== Family ==
Nanette Lasdon was born in 1924 in New York City, to pharmaceutical executive William S. Lasdon and his wife Mildred D. (Silverman) Lasdon. Her fathers siblings included fellow businessmen and philanthropists Jacob S. Lasdon and Stanley S. Lasdon. Nanette Lasdon grew up in Westchester County, N.Y. where the Lasdon family owned what is now Lasdon Park and Arboretum. After the property was sold to Westchester County, she donated funds for the William and Mildred Lasdon Memorial Garden to the park. Nanette Lasdon was married to Robert Alan Laitman (1921-1998).

== Three-dimensional art ==
After attending an opening at what was then the American Craft Museum, Nan Laitman became a member of a collector's circle, visiting artists' studios in New York with a museum curator to see and learn about the artists' work. She was interested in three-dimensional art formed of clay, fiber, glass, metal and wood, and was particularly attracted to ceramics. In addition to artworks from the American studio movement, she has collected artworks from Japan, France, and the United Kingdom. Her personal collection included works by Robert Arneson, Bennett Bean, Anthony Caro, Michele Oka Doner, Viola Frey, Sergei Isupov, Diane Itter, Anne Kraus, Linda MacNeil, Judy Kensley McKie, Marilyn Pappas, Grayson Perry, Adrian Saxe, and Terry Evans among many others.

"I can appreciate all the paintings that are on the walls of all the museums, but I am a much more tactile person. I like objects more than paintings on the walls," says Ms. Laitman. "And I was fascinated by the creativity of these artists and what they were doing.""–Nanette Laitman

== Museum of Arts and Design ==
The Museum of Arts and Design was first established in 1956 as the Museum of Contemporary Crafts on West 53rd Street. In 1986, it moved down the block and was renamed the American Craft Museum. In 2002, it moved to 2 Columbus Circle and became the Museum of Arts and Design, a transition that increased its attendance more than tenfold.

Through the transition to Columbus Circle, Nanette Laitman was the board president, and served on the building committee. She personally donated $5 million, and offered to match an additional $4 million in donations. This funded all four floors of exhibition space at the museum, which were named The Nanette L. Laitman Galleries. Other major donors included Jerome Chazen and Barbara Tober.

== Nanette Laitman Documentation Project for Craft and Decorative Arts in America ==
Through gifts to the Archives of American Art at the Smithsonian Institution, Laitman funded the Nanette Laitman Documentation Project for Craft and Decorative Arts in America. The project was planned around the collection of oral histories from 100 artists working with clay, fiber, glass, metal and wood. The Smithsonian has also collected archives of personal papers and gallery records as part of the project.

"These are the records of American artists who were overlooked and written out of the textbook history of American art. My dream was to reunite them with their colleagues in other disciplines as compatriots and equals."–Nanette Laitman, 2009

Laitman's "magnificent gift" has been described as "nothing short of transformative for the study of American craft", creating "a priceless record of the founders and builders of the American studio movement". Her work and the establishment of the museum have "given great credibility to the artists that were considered second tier up until now."

== Other organizations ==
Laitman has supported other arts and culture organizations including the Metropolitan Museum of Art, the Metropolitan Opera, the New York City Ballet, the New York Philharmonic, the New York Public Library.

She has also supported initiatives in medical research. She funded the creation of the Nanette Laitman Clinical Scholars Program in Public Health at Weill Medical College, Cornell University in 2006. The first of the Laitman Clinical Scholars was Dr. Shari R. Midoneck. Laitman has also supported the Albert Einstein College of Medicine at Yeshiva University.
