= Postmodernism: Style and Subversion 1970–1990 =

Museum exhibition

Postmodernism: Style and Subversion 1970 –1990 was an exhibition at the Victoria and Albert Museum (V&A) in London, from 24 September 2011 to 15 January 2012. It was billed as "the first in-depth survey of art, design and architecture of the 1970s and 1980s", curated by Glenn Adamson and Jane Pavitt.

== Exhibits ==
Over 250 objects were collected for the exhibition, which was organized in three "broadly chronological" sections, "roughly divided between architecture, music and design".

The first section focused mainly on architecture, "the discipline in which the ideas of postmodernism first emerged." Featured architects and designers included Ron Arad, Aldo Rossi, Charles Moore, and James Stirling, also fashion designers including Vivienne Westwood and Rei Kawakubo.

The second section focused on 1980s design, art, music, fashion, performance, and club culture. Artists included Grace Jones, Leigh Bowery, Klaus Nomi, Guy Bourdin, and Helmut Newton, also artifacts employed by Annie Lennox, Devo, Grandmaster Flash, Karole Armitage, Kazuo Ohno, and Michael Clark.

The final section examined "the hyper-inflated commodity culture of the 1980s", focusing on money as "a source of endless fascination for artists, designers and authors", including Andy Warhol, Karl Lagerfeld, Swatch, MTV and Disney.

== Curation and design ==
The exhibition was curated by Glenn Adamson and Jane Pavitt, the final of a three-part design history at the V&A comprising Modernism: Designing a New World 1914–39 (2006) and Cold War Modern: Design 1945–70 (2008–2009). Three-dimensional design was created by London-based architects Carmody Groarke, with graphic design by A Practice for Everyday Life (APFEL) design studio.

== Reception ==
A review in the journal Design Issues noted the "daunting prospect" of reviewing an exhibition "on what might be considered the most slippery, indefinable 'movement'", and wondered what the curators must have felt: "One reviewer thought it 'a risky curatorial undertaking,' and even the curators themselves admit it could be seen as 'a fool's errand.'" The review concludes, if the intention was to "excite, question, and inspire", the exhibition "achieves its purpose exceedingly well". On the other hand, if the goal was to "educate a public unaware of the intricacies of this 'most elusive of genres'", that outcome is uncertain: "But then, rather than blaming any shortcomings of the exhibition, this can be put down to the very nature of postmodernism itself."

ARTnews called it "a valiant attempt to grapple with that slipperiest of eras", commenting that "ruins were seen as sustenance", and noting the "apocalyptic" tones as well as "positive notes" and "joyful" designs. The few examples of media-centric art did "little to establish an understanding of such practices as bricolage and appropriation, and the critique of consumerism." Overall, "the exhibition functions best when sticking to facts and to concrete examples of architecture and design, rather than extrapolating beyond an already nebulous web of interconnecting disciplines."

A review in Frieze commented that "postmodernism didn’t end in 1990, contrary to curators Jane Pavitt and Glenn Adamson’s claim that it imploded in a blizzard of coke and cash at the end of the ’80s. What did end sometime in the early ’90s is the Postmodernist style. This was a restoration aesthetic for the end of both postwar social democracy and Eastern European non-capitalism, and rested on the newly total dominance of profit. It comprised an end-of-history sifting through the wreckage, reflective of an age that could no longer do anything new, a pop-inflected recalibration of the modern that assaults the purism of the International Style. All of these views are well represented at the V&A."

== Book ==
An accompanying book, Postmodernism: Style and Subversion, 1970–1990, was edited by the exhibition curators, Glenn Adamson and Jane Pavitt. A wide range of postmodern topics are addressed in 42 essays, written by Denise Scott Brown, Charles Jencks, Rick Poynor, David Byrne, and others. The depth of discussion distinguishes the book from typical exhibition catalogs.
