= Terence Riley (curator) =

American architect and museum curator (1954–2021)

Terence Riley (November 6, 1954 – May 17, 2021) was an American architect and museum curator. He was the chief curator of architecture and design at the Museum of Modern Art from 1992 to 2006.

== Early life and education ==
Riley was born in Elgin, Illinois, son of Philip Riley a printer, and Mary Jo (Lundberg) Riley, a homemaker. He grew up in Woodstock, Illinois, and graduated from the University of Notre Dame with a B.Arch in 1978, followed by an M.Arch at Columbia University in 1982.

== Career ==
In 1984, Riley formed the firm Keenen/Riley in 1984 with John Keenen. As a member of ACT UP, Riley worked on Let The Record Show…, a window installation that opened at the New Museum in 1987. In 1990, he opened the Arthur Ross Architecture Gallery at Columbia, and was recruited by Philip Johnson a year later to work at the Museum of Modern Art, becoming Philip Johnson Chief Curator for architecture and design in 1992. He helped to found the MoMA/P.S.1 Young Architects Program. In 2006 he became director of the Miami Art Museum, stepping down in 2009 to return to architectural practice in Miami.

During his tenure at MoMA, Terence Riley organized or co-organized numerous exhibitions, including Frank Gehry: New Furniture Prototypes (1992), The Nara Convention Hall: International Design Competition (1992), The Tokyo International Forum by Rafael Viñoly Architects (1993), The New Austrian Cultural Institute by Raimund Abraham (1993), Frank Lloyd Wright: Architect (1994), Thresholds/Bernard Tschumi: Architecture and Event (1994), OMA at MoMA: Rem Koolhaas and the Place of Public Architecture (1994), Light Construction (1995), Fabrications (1998), The Un-Private House (1999), Mies in Berlin (2001), The Changing of the Avant-Garde (2002), Tall Buildings (2004), Yoshio Taniguchi: Nine Museums (2004), Artist’s Choice: Herzog & de Meuron, Perception Restrained (2006), and On-Site: New Architecture in Spain (2006)
