= Preservation League of New York State =

Nonprofit organization

The Preservation League of New York State (Preserve NYS) is a nonprofit organization which works to preserve historic structures in New York. Established in 1974, Preserve NYS supports preservation efforts through information on best practices, professional resources, grants, and awards to outstanding preservation projects. Many projects in New York have benefited from the Preservation League's support, with 62 projects receiving grants between 2000 and 2004 alone.

A 2006 survey, supported by the New York State Council on the Arts, of the 2000 - 2004 Preserve NYS grant recipients found that funds supplied by the Preservation League “lead directly to the rehabilitation of historic places, leverage significant additional resources (cash and in-kind), and protect properties at the local, state and national levels through landmark designations.” Approximately half of the projects supported by this group of grants were “cultural resources surveys,” resulting in 8,472 resources' identification and 1,294 new listings on the New York State or National Register of Historic Places.

A list of projects which have received the Preservation League's “Excellence in Historic Preservation Awards” can be found here. An example of such a project is the Altamont, NY Free Library.

Its offices are housed in the Building at 44 Central Avenue, listed on the National Register of Historic Places in 2014.

== General References ==
- Preservation League of New York State, 1975-2002. M.E. Grenander Department of Special Collections and Archives, University Libraries, University at Albany, State University of New York (hereafter referred to as the Preservation League of New York State Records).
