= Jenni Sorkin =

American art historian and curator (born 1977)

- Born: Jennifer Sorkin; August 29, 1977 (age 49); Chicago, Illinois, U.S.
- Education: Bard College, School of the Art Institute of Chicago, Yale University
- Occupations: Art history, art critic, curator, writer, educator
- Known for: Art history, art criticism
- Movement: Feminist art, crafts
- Website: www.arthistory.ucsb.edu/people/jenni-sorkin

Jenni Sorkin (born August 29, 1977) is an American art historian, curator, and educator. She is best known for her writing in art criticism, and for highlighting work by feminist artists and artists working in fiber and associated crafts.

== Biography ==
Jenni Sorkin was born in Chicago, Illinois, on August 29, 1977. She received a PhD in Art History from Yale University in 2010. She also attended the School of the Art Institute of Chicago and Bard College.

In 2004, Sorkin received the "Art Journal Award" for her publication "Envisioning High Performance" (2003).

Sorkin is the author of the book Live Form: Women, Ceramics, and Community (2016), and her essays have appeared in exhibition catalogs for various artists. She is on the faculty of the department of art history at the University of California, Santa Barbara. She is on the editorial board for "The Journal of Modern Craft"

Sorkin was the co-curator (with Paul Schimmel) of Revolution in the Making: Abstract Sculpture by Women 1947–2016, the inaugural exhibition at Hauser Wirth & Schimmel in Los Angeles. The exhibition featured sculptures by 34 women artists.

In 2020, Sorkin published an article called "Talk Back: Be a Generalist!" on Panorama, journal of the association of historians of American Art.

In 2021, Sorkin published Art in California, which provides a chronology of art-making in a state at the intersection of migration and global politics, including the institutions and networks that have shaped the radical art movements of California.

== See also ==
- Women in the art history field
