= Holly Hotchner =

Holly Hotchner is the former president and CEO of the National Women's History Museum.

Hotchner previously served as the director of the Museum of Arts and Design, or MAD, (formerly the American Craft Museum), in New York City from 1996 to 2013. She was appointed by the museum’s board of governors in 1996. Under her leadership, MAD built a new 58,000-square-foot (5,400 m^{2}) home at 2 Columbus Circle in Manhattan, which opened in September 2008. After 16 years as director, she announced in January 2013 that she would step down at the end of April 2013.

Prior to holding this position, she served as director of the New York Historical Society Museum from 1988-1995. There, her responsibilities included restructuring the administration, overseeing a staff of 40, participating in raising more than $40 million for the institution’s collections, and managing the museum's education programs, general operations, and facilities capital improvement program. From 1984-1988 she was chief conservator at the Historical Society, where she led a new program to enhance the care and cataloguing of the museum’s 1.5 million-object collection.

Before joining the New York Historical Society, Hotchner was a Conservation fellow at the Metropolitan Museum of Art, and also held positions at The Tate Gallery in London, the Hirshhorn Museum in Washington, D.C., the Museum of Modern Art, New York and the Metropolitan Museum of Art in New York.

She holds an M.A. in Art History and a certificate of conservation from the Institute of Fine Arts at New York University, and a B.A. in Art History and Studio Art from Trinity College.

She has served on numerous panels for government funding of the arts, and as a juror for exhibitions and for artists’ awards. She also established Holly Hotchner Fine Arts Management, which provided collections management, cataloguing and conservation services to individuals and corporations.

During her tenure, she has increased the MAD’s operating funds and endowment, while expanding its exhibition programming and outreach. She co-organized a number of critically acclaimed exhibitions at the Museum with accompanying catalogues, including Radical Lace & Subversive Knitting; the series on contemporary Native American art, Changing Hands: Art Without Reservation; Ruth Duckworth: Modernist Sculptor; Corporal Identity–Body Language; Beatrice Wood: A Centennial Tribute; 4 Acts in Glass; Art & Industry: 20th Century Porcelain from Sèvres; Defining Craft I: Collecting for the New Millennium; and Venetian Glass: 20th Century Italian Glass from the Olnick Spanu Collection.
