= Lasdon Park and Arboretum =

Park in Somers, New York, United States

Coordinates: 41.27586°N 73.734573°W

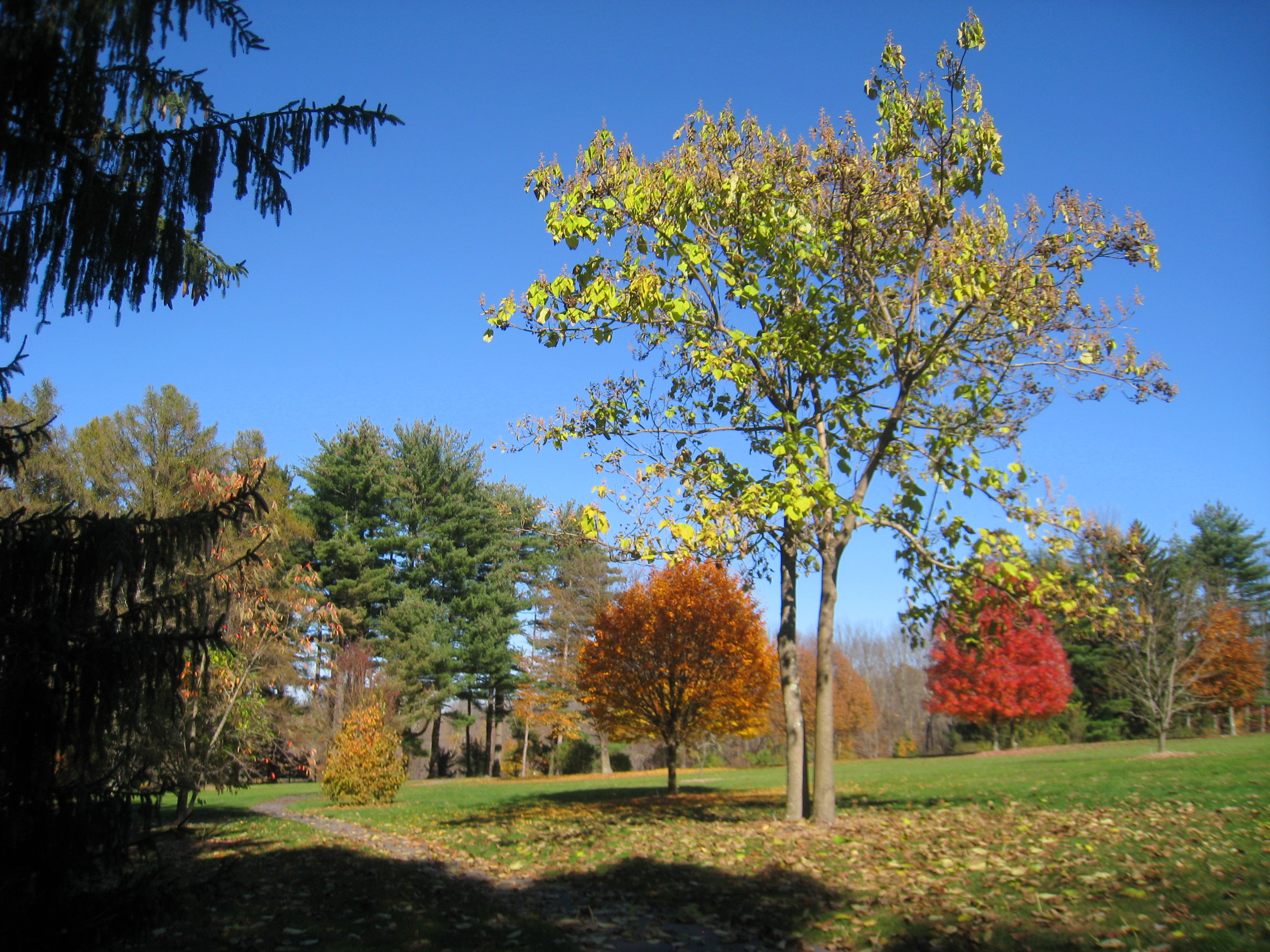
Lasdon Park and Arboretum

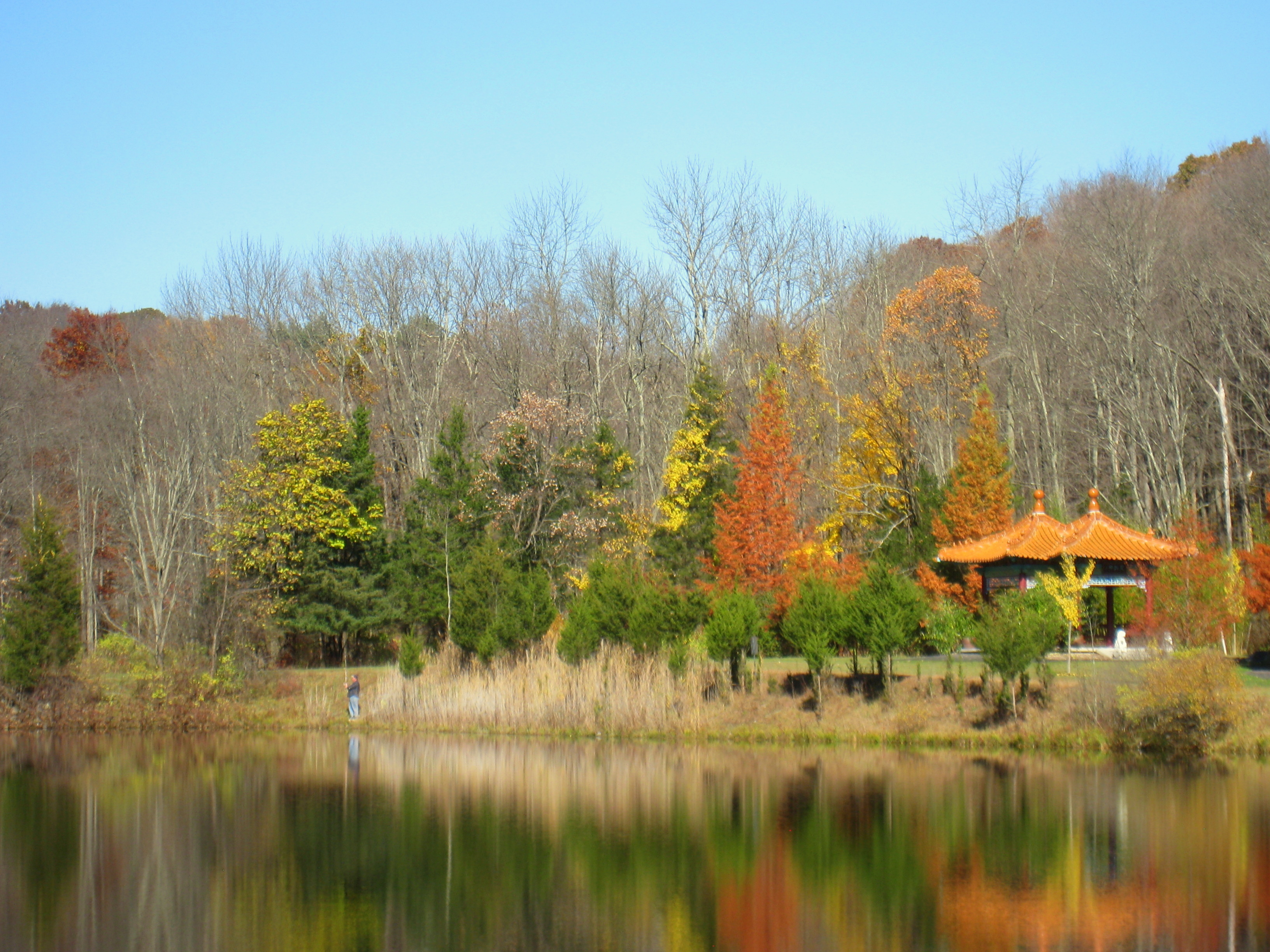
Chinese Friendship Pavilion and Cultural Garden

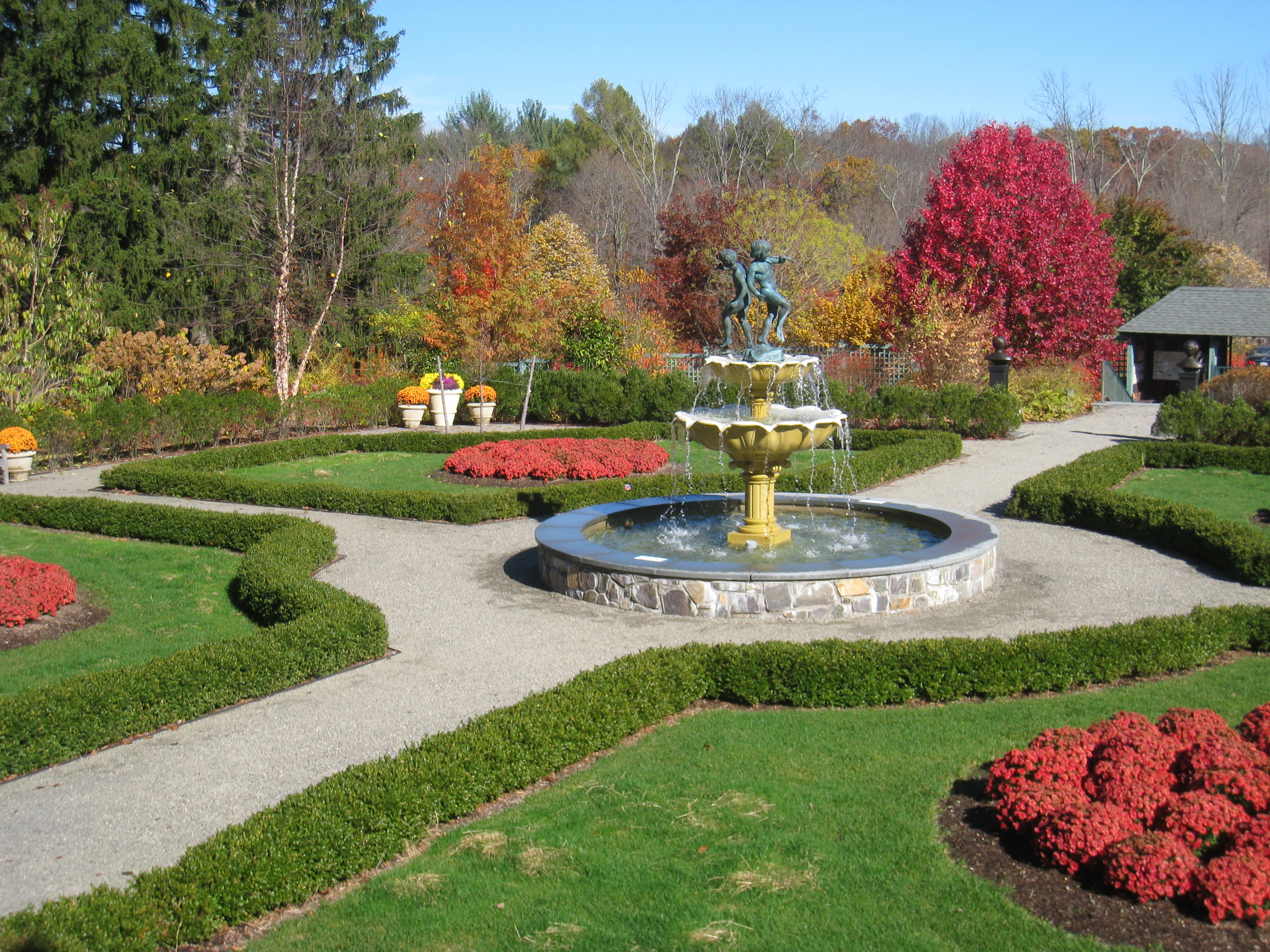
William and Mildred Lasdon Memorial Garden

Lasdon Park and Arboretum (95 ha / 234 acres) is a public park containing gardens and an arboretum (12 ha / 30 acres). It is located on New York State Route 35, Somers, New York, and open to the public daily without charge.

Originally called Cobbling Rock Farm, the property was purchased by William and Mildred Lasdon in 1939. The Lasdon family had a keen interest in horticulture and imported many tree specimens to the estate. In 1986 Westchester County purchased the property.

The park contains woodlands, an open grass meadow, and formal gardens with flower and shrub specimens from all over the world. It also contains a Chinese Friendship Pavilion as gift from the People’s Republic of China to the citizens of Westchester.

- Arboretum (12 ha / 30 acres) - The arboretum consists of woodlands, open grass meadows and formal gardens featuring trees, shrubs, and flowers from around the world. The arboretum includes extensive lilac and pine collections, a large azalea garden, a yellow magnolia grove, and a flowering tree grove. Surrounding the arboretum is a pond and 200 acres (0.81 km^{2}) of woodlands that contain many specimen trees and plantings.
- Azalea Garden - a large garden with hundreds of red, white, pink, magenta, yellow, and lavender azaleas, with small ponds and waterfalls.
- Dwarf Conifer Collection - a variety of dwarf pine, spruce, fir, and cypress.
- Magnolias - various magnolia species, including several rare yellow specimens developed at the Brooklyn Botanic Garden in the 1950s.
- Famous and Historic Tree Trail - species that commemorate historic events and famous Americans. At each station, one can read about a famous person or event to which the parent tree was witness.
- William and Mildred Lasdon Memorial Garden (0.4 ha / 1 acre) - an entrance court with a fragrance garden; a formal garden with boxwood hedges, heather, flowering annuals and bulbs, and a central fountain; and a synoptic garden featuring hundreds of shrubs whose names represent every letter in the alphabet, from "A" (Abelia) through "Z" (Zenobia).
- Mildred D. Lasdon Bird and Nature Sanctuary (22 acres)
- Chinese Friendship Pavilion and Cultural Garden (1.6 ha / 4 acres) - a pavilion given by Westchester's Sister City, Jingzhou in the People's Republic of China, within a young Chinese-style garden with plantings including bamboo and Kousa dogwood, pond, and a stone dust pathway.
- American chestnuts (1.2 ha / 3 acres) - Since 1992 when a 3-acre (12,000 m^{2}) grove of rare American chestnut trees was discovered at the arboretum, Westchester County has been working with The American Chestnut Foundation to develop a disease-resistant form of this tree. An additional 5 acres (20,000 m^{2}) collects chestnuts from around the United States for use in ongoing genetic research.
- Dogwoods - more than 80 dogwood trees from around the world, part of a research project to combat dogwood diseases.

== Westchester County Veterans Museum & Memorials ==
Lasdon Park also features the Westchester County Veterans Museum, with exhibits of photographs, historical documents, artifacts and memorabilia about Westchester County residents who served in the United States armed forces in time of war, from the Revolutionary War to the present. There is no admission charge to the museum.

In addition to the museum, there are four memorials to Westchester residents who served in the military: the Merchant Marine Memorial; the Trail of Honor, 12 stone cairns that display the busts of combat soldiers from the American Revolution through Operation Desert Storm; the Korean Wear Memorial; and the Westchester Vietnam Veterans Memorial, a sculpture of three seven-foot bronze statues that depict a soldier carrying a wounded comrade, with a nurse reaching out to assist them. Nearby, a flagpole is set on a base with inscriptions of Westchester County servicemen and eight women nurses killed in Vietnam.

== See also ==
- List of botanical gardens in the United States
- Lasdon family
