= Collaberg School =

Free school in the US (1961-1970)

Coordinates: 41.229°N 73.985°W

The Collaberg School (originally known as the Barker School) founded in 1961 was the first 'free school' in the United States based on the model of the Summerhill School in England. The school was located in Stony Point, 30 miles (48 km) from New York City. Collaberg School enrolled between 25 and 50 students from kindergarten through high school in its experimental curriculum. The school closed in 1970 but during its short lifespan was a touchpoint for many of the notable figures of the burst of creative energy that was the 1960s.

== Founding ==
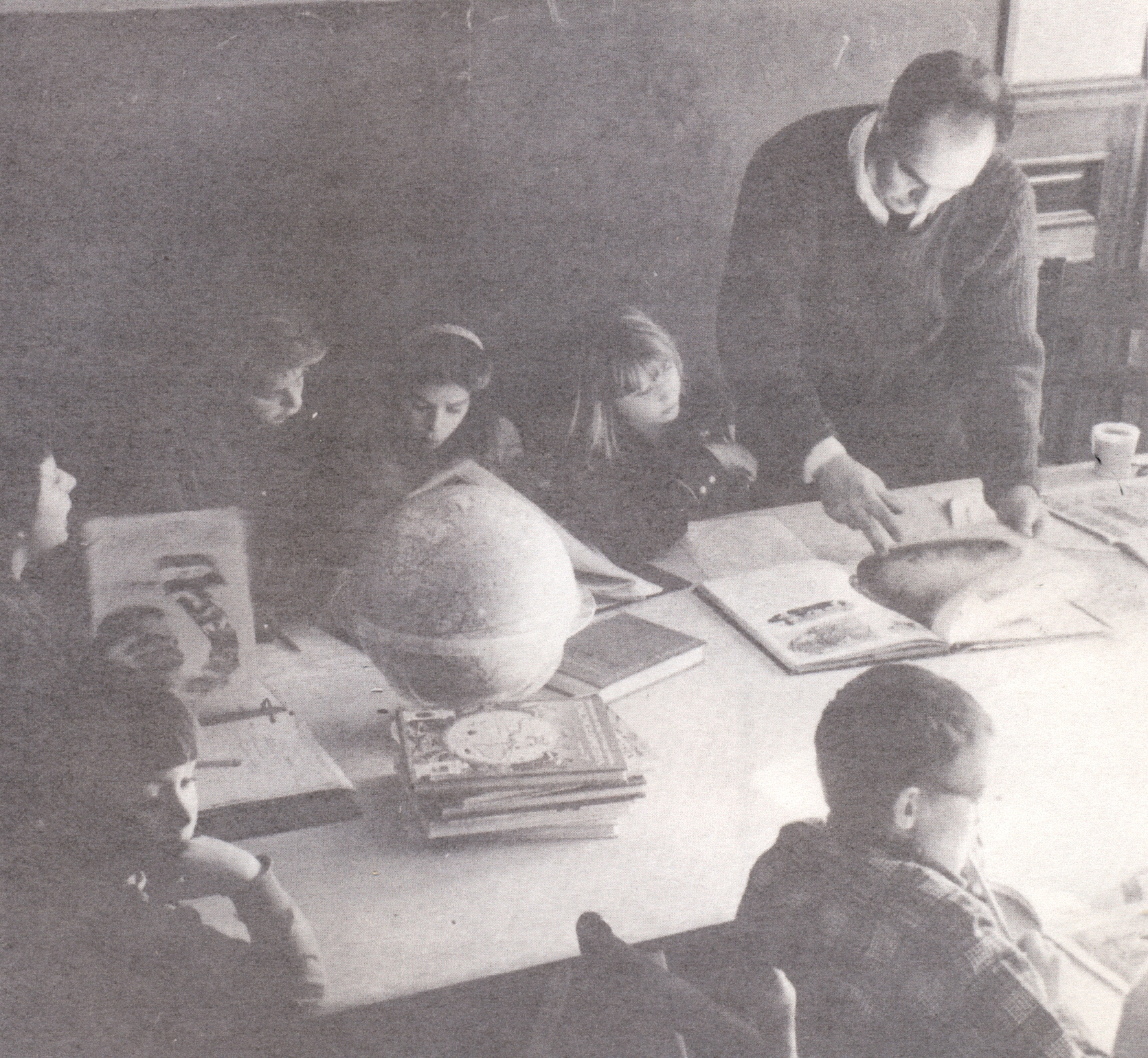
Headmaster Robert Barker guides third through sixth graders in a discussion of current events as part of the social studies program

In 1960 following the publication of A.S. Neill's book Summerhill: A Radical Approach to Child Rearing about a radical, free-school in England, a group of parents and educators in the New York City area began talking about trying to start a Summerhill type school. A number of this group had attended Black Mountain College in North Carolina, an experimental college started in 1933. This was the meeting place for a notable group of creative free-thinkers including Paul and Vera Williams, John Cage, M. C. Richards, Karen Karnes, David Weinrib, Patsy and LaNoue Davenport. After leaving Black Mountain in the early 1950s they founded the Gate Hill Cooperative (known as "The Land") in Stony Point, New York, 30 miles from New York City. Many in the group were interested in education and had young children of their own but did not want to enroll them in a traditional school. Educational philosopher and Gestalt therapist Paul Goodman who had spent a summer at Black Mountain teaching, was living in New York and came to know the folks at the Land. They shared ideas about education and were particularly interested in Summerhill. Goodman suggested that Robert Barker, a frequent visitor to the Land and teacher, go to England. Barker spent a year working at Summerhill and learning about their new approach to education from 1959 to 1960. When Barker returned he led the founding in 1961 of the first school in the United States based on the Summerhill model. Incorporators of the school were Bob Barker and his wife Esther, Mabel Chrystie, Paul Goodman, and Harold Ardnoff. The school was founded on two central principles: community and collaboration. Both of these principles had been part of the ethos of Summerhill and Black Mountain. In contrast mainstream education in that era was based on hierarchy and competition.

== 1961-1963 ==
The Barker School, as it was first named, initially was located in rented space in Stony Point, New York, in the building that is now the town hall. Unlike the Summerhill School which was a boarding school, the Barker School was only for day students. The faculty included Robert Barker (headmaster), Vera Williams (art), Paul Williams (shop), Stanley Amdurer (science), Mabel Chrystie (kindergarten), Patricia Davenport (music), Betsy Epstein (kindergarten), Herbert Haslam (music), Selma Hill (dance), Paul Hultberg (art), and Ellen Rockwell (kindergarten). Following the model of the Summerhill School attendance at classes was voluntary. Following the Summerhill model, the school held regular democratic meetings at which everyone, even young children, had an equal voice and vote. The school sought to cultivate students's innate curiosity and to foster a lifelong love of learning. Headmaster Barker said that the school philosophy was: "We keep creativity to the maximum, competition to the minimum."

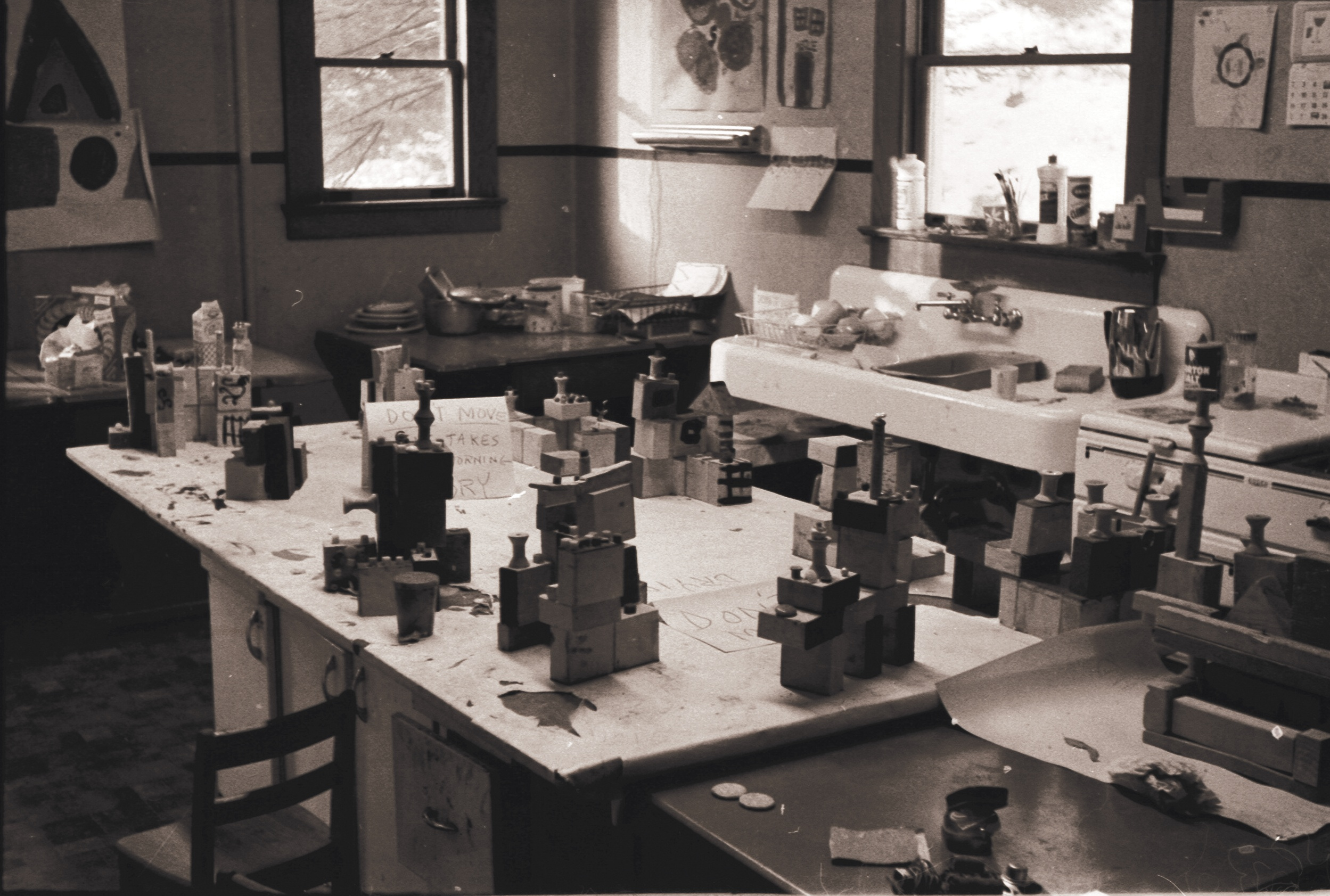
Kitchen at Collaberg School with art and science projects everywhere! (1963)

=== Moving to Thiell's Road ===
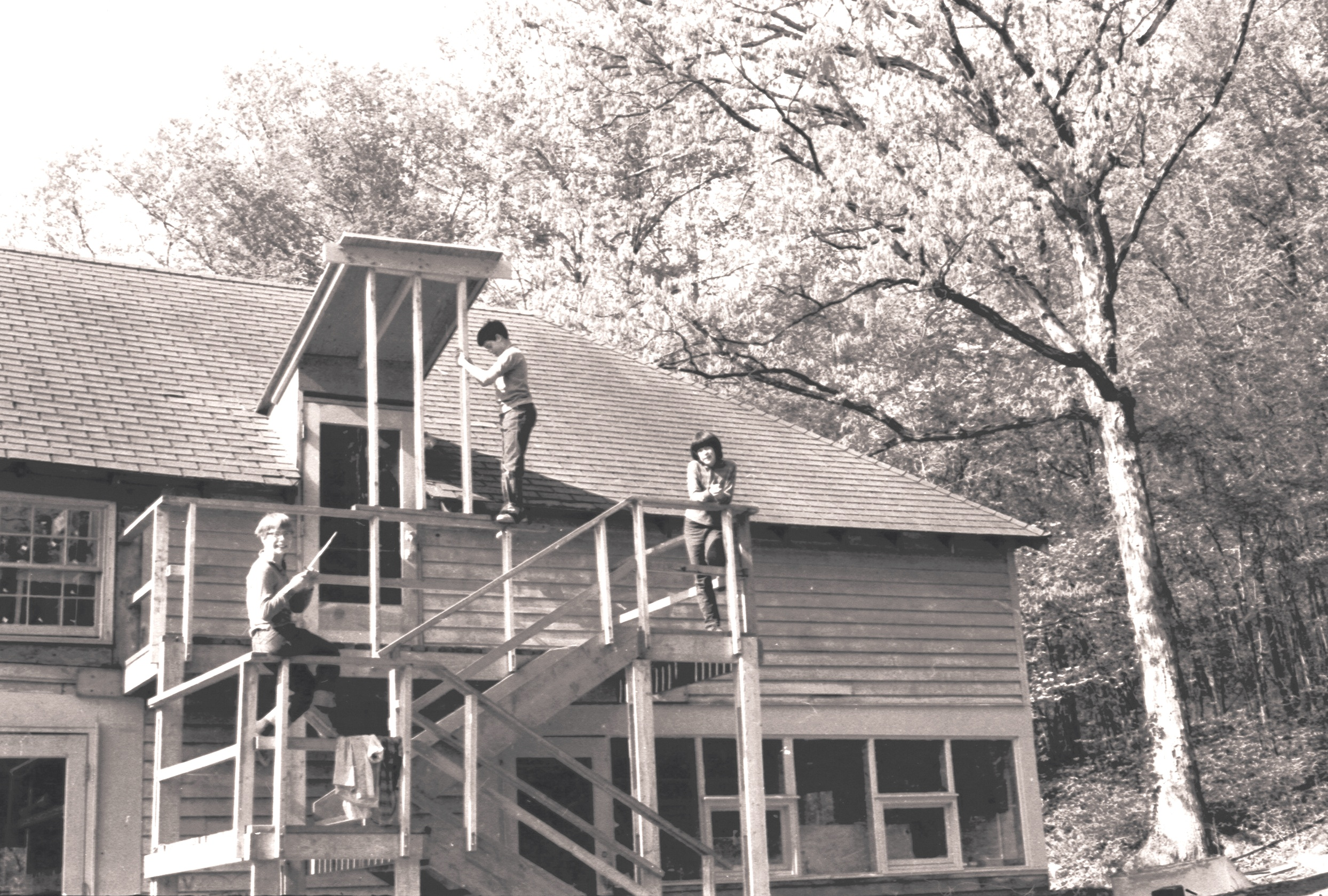
Students at Collaberg School playing outside the barn building (1964)

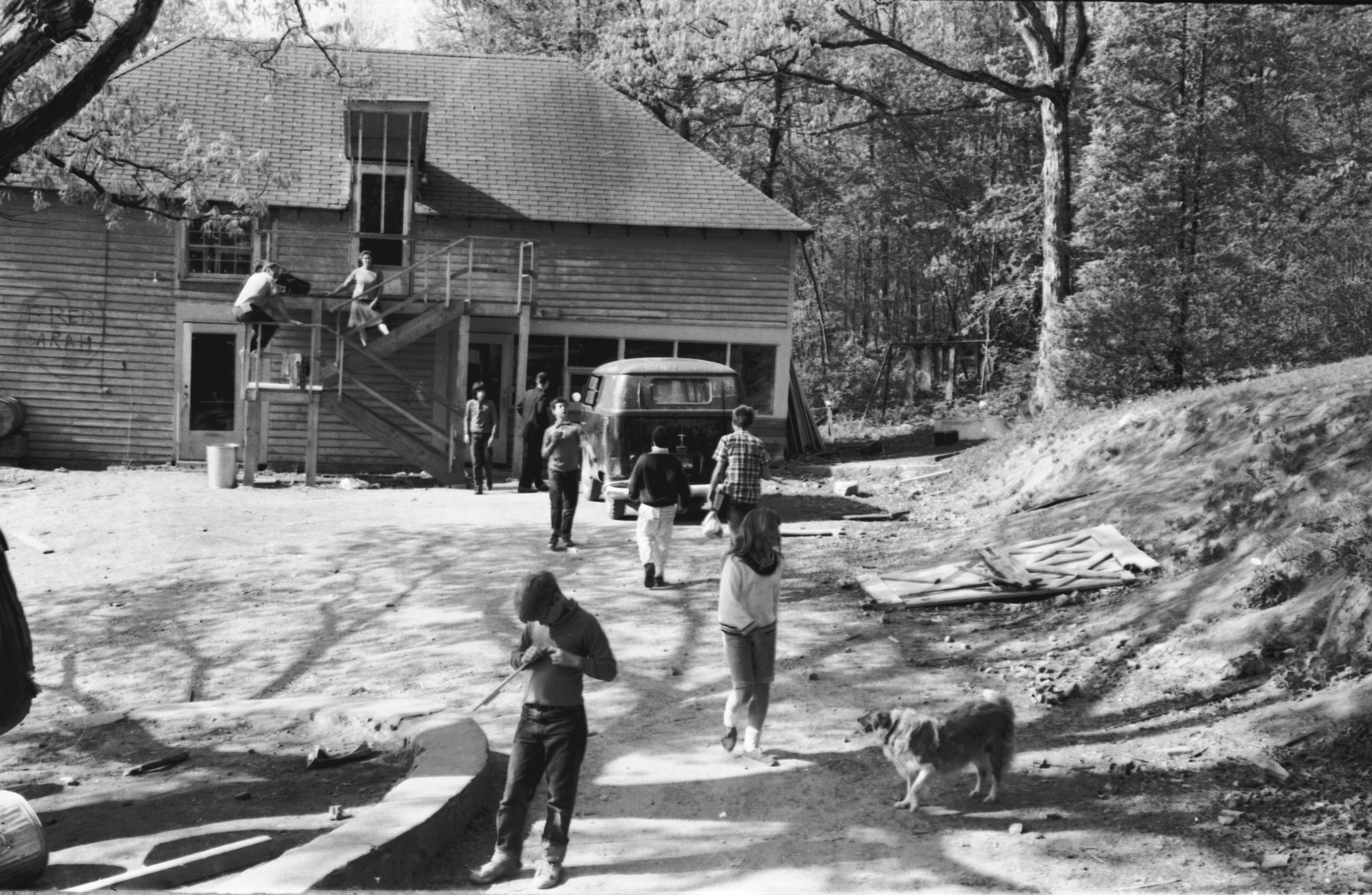
Students and teachers outside at the Collaberg School (1964)

In the fall of 1962 with financial help from architect Paul Williams (and husband of school co-founder Vera Williams) the school purchased a thirteen-acre piece of land on Thiell's Road in Stony Point. A large Victorian house, farmhouse, and barn were on the property. The new location enabled the school to expand its curriculum and with the renovation of the farmhouse began accepting boarding students. In the move to Thiell's Road the school lost some teachers but gained others including: Remy Charlip (dance), Karl Riley (science), Steve Durkee (art), George Ancona (Spanish), Don and Paula Plesnicar (music). The school had close connections throughout its history with the nearby Gate Hill Cooperative ("The Land"). There was a constant back and forth between the Land and the School. Many of the students at the School were children of members of the Land. Students from the school went to the Land and were exposed to artists living there such as musician LaNoue Davenport, potters M. C. Richards and Karen Karnes, singer Sheila Schonbrun, and multi-media artists Sari Dienes and Stan Vanderbeek. It was indeed a rich educational environment.

=== Challenges and New Directions ===
There arose a debate within the school staff regarding educational philosophy, whether to depart from the Summerhill model. Paul Goodman had referred two children to the school who had severe behavior problems and were very disruptive. This led to a debate about whether the school should have an open admission policy and become more of a therapeutic school. The decision was made to ask the troublesome students to leave. This prompted teachers Herb Haslam and Mabel Chrystie to leave at the end of the 1963 school year. Mabel and her husband, George Dennison, would go on to found the First Street School in New York City. Always facing financial difficulty, the school was in deep trouble by the end of 1963. Headmaster Barker was a fine teacher but lacked the administrative skills needed to keep the school financially solvent. In January 1964, Barker left the school.

== 1964-1966 ==
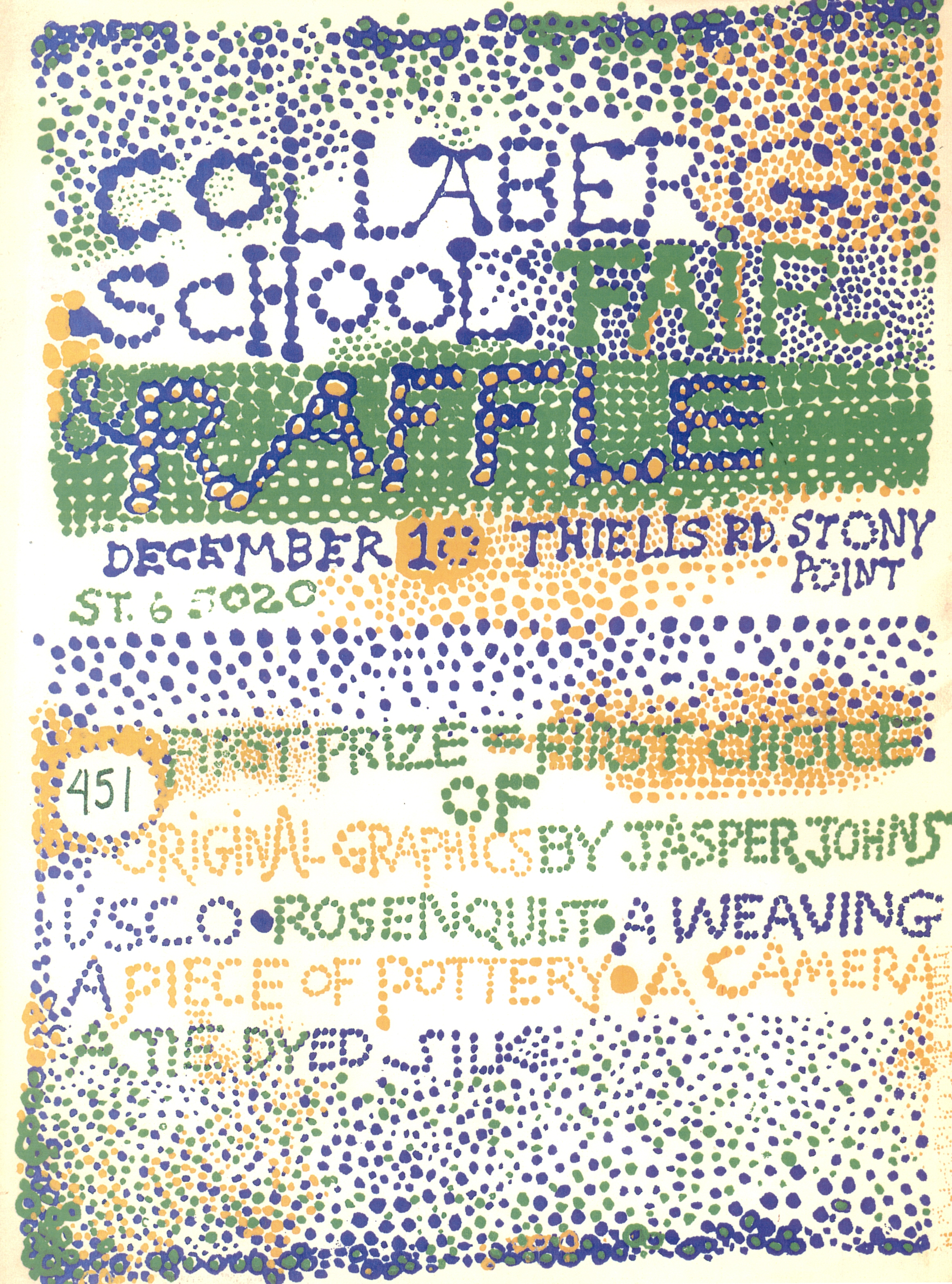
Poster for the Collaberg School Fair in 1966 at which a work by Jasper Johns was raffled

Following Barker's departure, Karl Riley served as interim headmaster while the school looked for a replacement. They hired Dr. Leo Koch who would serve as the school director from 1964 to 1967. Koch had an academic background having been an assistant professor of biology at the University of Illinois Urbana-Champaign. But he was very much the radical educational and social reformer. In 1960 Koch had been fired from his post in Urbana for writing a letter to the local newspaper for espousing what at the time was a radical view supporting the practice of premarital sex. The case eventually was appealed to the Supreme Court which they declined to hear. In 1963 he taught at the Summerlane Camp—an educational venture inspired by the Summerhill School in England.

=== Experimenting with Curriculum ===
Under Koch's direction the school began teaching academic subjects in the morning. Reading and writing were taught across the curriculum rather than as separate subjects—an idea that didn't become common until the 1970s. In the afternoons at Collaberg School students learned through a wide variety of experiential activities. Staff took students to visit museums, parks, old mines, historic sites, markets, docks, demonstrations, factories, and interesting architecture. Koch described the curriculum: “Each child has complete freedom to choose among the activities at a given time. Many of these activities are taught by parents and friends of the school so that a much greater variety is possible than would be the case if only the regular staff were involved.” For example, electronics innovator and cofounder of nearby USCO, Michael Callahan, set up an electronics shop in the basement of the school building and taught a number of students. Twice a year the School put on a craft fair. In 1965 then just up-and-coming artists Jasper Johns, Roy Lichtenstein, and Andy Warhol donated prints to be raffled. The fairs were major fundraisers to support the always cash-strapped school, but more importantly served as a focus for creative, hands-on activities for students including student made clothing (tie dye and batik) baked good, cafe foods, classical music concerts, and puppet shows. Teacher Vera Williams described the school curriculum saying: "You learn by having a vastly expanded environment, by having a lot of variety, a lot of static, a lot of things that distract you. You learn in exactly the opposite way you thought you did."

== 1967-1970 ==
In June 1967 Dr. Leo Koch stepped down as school director and became coordinator for Vietnam Summer, a national anti-war canvassing project. Vera Williams and Jack Carson became co-directors of Collaberg. Vera had been a co-founder of the school and remained with the school throughout its tenure. A talented and creative artist, she would go on to become a prominent author/illustrator of children's books such as "A Chair for My Mother." Jack Carson and his then wife Kate who began as the first boarding house parents in 1963. Jack had served in the army and attended Dartmouth College for a few years, then worked as a farmer for a while. Jack did much of the maintenance work at Collaberg and taught students hands on skills like carpentry. Radical ideas had great appeal for Jack and he was enamored with the writings of Paul Goodman. Jack led the students in the reading and study of Goodman's novel "Empire City." The class culminated in a field trip to visit Goodman in his home in New Hampshire and discuss the book. In 1970 students staged a performance of "Dido and Aeneas" directed by Sheila Schonbrun. On several occasions during these years students and staff joined protest marches against the Vietnam War in Washington, D.C. The school described its philosophy: "We believe in letting our children develop at their own pace, intellectually and emotionally--allowing each person to decide what he wants to learn and how, free of pressure to conform."

=== A Meeting Place ===
Collaberg was a meeting place for all manner of avant-garde groups and radicals in the late 1960s. In 1968 the Bread and Puppet Theater, known for their radical political demonstrations, came to the school. Multi-media pioneers from USCO came to Collaberg and did a presentation. In 1968 members of the radical hippie commune, the Hog Farm, including Hugh Romney (a.k.a. Wavy Gravy) visited Collaberg. Later in 1969 author Ken Kesey and his Merry Pranksters came east in their bus Further and visited the school sharing their radical anti-establishment ideas.

== Government Harassment ==
During the 1960s the New York State Police under Governor Nelson Rockefeller launched a massive surveillance campaign of suspected subversive groups and individuals. State police officials labeled the Collaberg School as being communist. In 1964 a special meeting was held in Rockefeller's offices at which representatives of several executive departments of state government decided to conduct surveillance of the school and to do repeated health and fire inspections of the facility. As one high-ranking state police official said, "The whole idea was to close it down. One way or the other, they were going to get rid of it. It was considered a left-wing operation, sort of a pre-hippie thing." The state even sent an undercover investigator to the school posing as a prospective parent to gather information about the school's philosophy. Police cruisers were posted at the entrance to the school and would routinely stop vehicles leaving the premises. Students were frequently searched for drugs. No arrests were ever made. The local health department did inspections and cited the school for a whole list of violations. The staff were forced to completely renovate the kitchen, install a new septic system, and test and treat the well which provided water for the school. Then at the start of 1970 the town of Stony Point passed a zoning regulation banning schools in the area where Collaberg was located. The school did not have the financial resources to fight the regulation. In June 1970 the school closed.

== End of an Experiment ==
Collaberg School ended its short life in 1970 due to a combination of external and internal factors. Government harassment and especially the new zoning regulation forced the school to close. But life and education at Collaberg were becoming increasingly difficult due to personality conflicts amongst staff, financial problems, the destabilizing presence of hangers-on at the school and associated drug problems. Classes did not resume in the fall of 1970 and in 1978 the property was finally sold.

== Impact ==
The Barker/Collaberg School was a forerunner of the free school movement in the United States, one of the first of what would become thousands of small experimental schools to open during the 1960s and 1970s. The School was also at the forefront of the cultural changes occurring in the 1960s: the Hippie Movement, a radical approach to personal freedom, the rise of the social conscience, loosening of cultural norms regarding sexuality and drug use. The school was a key part of a community in the Stony Point area that was the fountain of tremendous creativity in the arts, music, dance, and design. Indeed, the Collaberg School was a unique focal point for many of the counter-cultural people that led the social revolution of the 1960s.
