= Pétur =

Given name

Pétur (Icelandic pronunciation: [ˈpʰjɛːtʏr̥]) or Petur is a given name. Notable people with the name include:

- Petur Alberg (1885–1940), Faroese violin player and songwriter from Tórshavn
- Pétur Blöndal (1944–2015), Icelandic congressman in the Icelandic Independence Party
- Pétur Eyþórsson (born 1978), glima champion, having won the glima grettisbelt multiple times
- Petur Gabrovski (1898–1947), Bulgarian politician who briefly served as Prime Minister during the Second World War
- Pétur Guðmundsson (athlete) (born 1962), retired male shot putter from Iceland
- Pétur Guðmundsson (basketball) (born 1958), retired Icelandic professional basketball player
- Pétur Gunnarsson (born 1947), Icelandic writer from Reykjavík
- Petur Hliddal (born 1945), American sound engineer
- Pétur Marteinsson (born 1973), retired Icelandic football player
- Pétur Ormslev (born 1958), retired football midfielder
- Pétur Pétursson (born 1959), retired Icelandic footballer who was active as a forward
- Pétur Pétursson (bishop) (1808–1891), Icelandic Lutheran bishop
- Pétur Sigurgeirsson (1919–2010), the Bishop of Iceland from 1981 until 1989
- Pétur Þorsteinsson (born 1955), Icelandic neologist, youth-leader and vicar of the Lutheran church
- Petur Tryggvi (born 1956), Icelandic gold and silversmith
