= Gate Hill Cooperative =

Experimental artists' colony in New York

Coordinates: 41.222°N 74.05°W

Gate Hill Cooperative, also known as The Land, is an experimental artists’ colony and intentional community located in Stony Point, Rockland County, New York. It is often viewed as an extension of Black Mountain College in Western North Carolina.

== Founding community ==
Gate Hill Cooperative was founded in 1953 by former Black Mountain College (BMC) students Paul and Vera Williams. Its inspiration came from playwright and critic Paul Goodman's publication Communitas: Means of Livelihood and Ways of Life and his teaching when he served as faculty at the BMC Summer Institute of 1950.

The group forming the immediate basis for the Gate Hill Cooperative included BMC instructors Karen Karnes, David Weinrib, John Cage, David Tudor, and poet and potter M.C. Richards, whose ideas on community living were also a major catalyst for the creation of the cooperative. Among the artists, composers, filmmakers, choreographers, poets, and potters who moved to Gate Hill Cooperative later on were BMC alumnus Stan VanDerBeek. Individuals who joined the community without a prior association with BMC included Sari Dienes and enamel muralist Paul Hultberg and his wife Ethel Hultberg. Though they were not BMC alumni, the Hultberg's were well ensconced in the New York art scene, later referred to as the New York School, and were friends with the most celebrated artists of their time, including Willem de Kooning and Elaine de Kooning, Jasper Johns and Robert Rauscheberg, and sculptors John Chamberlain and Marc di Suvero.

The NY School included not just painters and sculptors, but also among their friends and peers, the Hultberg's associated with musicians, poets, authors, dancers, theater groups and political activists, among other leaders of what was considered the avant garde. This included Denise Levertov, Robert Creeley, Joel Oppenheimer, LeRoy Jones (later Amiri Baraka), Robert Duncan and Gregory Corso; composers, Karlheinz Stockhausen, Luigi Nono, Pierre Boulez, Morton Feldman, and Toshi Ichiyanagi (Yoko Ono's first husband); jazz musicians Ornette Coleman and Don Cherry; political activist Bayard Rustin; and artists Karel Appel and Pierre Soulage. It was through their friendship with composer and author John Cage that they moved to the community.

Founders Paul and Vera Williams lived at Gate Hill Cooperative until their divorce in 1970. Potter Karen Karnes stayed for twenty-five years, until the late 1970s, providing the community with a key source of income through sales of her ceramics. Of its original community, the experimental composer David Tudor remained the longest on The Land, working out of his studio there until 1995.

== Connection to 20th-century avant-garde ==
Although the community privileged a rural, rustic lifestyle with an emphasis on family life, it was also linked to the international avant-garde and the New York City experimental arts scene of the late 1950s and early 1960s. It saw frequent visitors from NYC and became the site of both organized and ad hoc events associated with Fluxus, Happenings, Judson Dance Theater, expanded cinema, and intermedia and other movements fostered by interdisciplinary and transitory creative collaboration.

The poet Robert Duncan, who had been one of the last remaining faculty members at Black Mountain College before its closure in 1957, was critical of the New York avant-garde scene, but saw Gate Hill as a positive exception. He wrote to James Broughton during a visit in June 1956 that his time with M.C. Richards and John Cage there "inspires what shreds of art I have left for such climates."

Gate Hill Cooperative attracted significant press attention and an increase in visitors in 1966 due to the unveiling of Stan VanDerBeek's prototype structure for his Movie-Drome, an immersive audiovisual environment built using the top of a grain silo. The Movie-Drome garnered national media coverage in Newsweek, Film Culture and the Village Voice, and the Lincoln Center sponsored a bus tour to visit it, attracting visitors including Shirley Clarke, Ed Emshwiller, Agnes Varda, Andy Warhol, and Annette Michelson. Art historian Gloria Sutton states that the visitors received "a hand-sketched map circulated by VanDerBeek ... with the northern most tip of Manhattan being the last discernable signpost."

The abstract expressionist artwork of founding Gate Hill Coop member, Paul Hultberg, was considered pioneering. His murals were favorably compared by critics to that of his contemporaries, Abstract Expressionist painters Jackson Pollock, Franz Kline and Clyfford Still. Coop founding member M.C. Richards wrote an early in-depth article about Paul Hultberg for the April 1960 issue of Craft Horizons magazine. In addition to providing historical biographical information the article reviews Hultberg's body of work exhibited in the show of contemporary enameling in the U.S. at the Museum of Contemporary Craft. Hultberg's large copper enamels were promiately featured in the 1959 Contemporary Enamels: A National Survey exhibition and even graced the cover of the November 1959 Craft Horizons magazine detailing the event.

Hultberg's work were also included in the seminal 1969 show Objects:USA, a groundbreaking exhibition, considered a watershed in the history of the American Studio Craft Movement. Hultberg's contribution to the exhibit, titled "Johnson Together", received a two-page color spread in the accompanying catalog. It was one of the few objects from the show that the Johnson Company kept as part of its permanent collection where it currently hangs in their Johnson Wax Headquarters, designed by Frank Lloyd Wright. It was loaned to the Racine Museum of Art for their 50-year anniversary exhibit, OBJECTS REDUX: 50 Years After OBJECTS:USA Defined American Craft. A companion period piece by Paul Hultberg, titled "Little Johnson", was exhibited in NYC by R & Company for their OBJECTS USA 2024 exhibition, and included in their catalog.

Other visitors throughout the 1960s who contributed to the experimental artistic atmosphere were composers Karlheinz Stockhausen, Pierre Boulez, Morton Feldman; artists Jasper Johns, Richard Lippold, Robert Rauschenberg; ceramicist Peter Voulkos; and The Living Theatre’s Judith Malina and Julian Beck. Dancer and potter Paulus Berensohn claimed that visiting the Gate Hill Cooperative and seeing Karen Karnes working there was a pivotal moment in his artistic career.
