= Erin M. Riley =

American artist

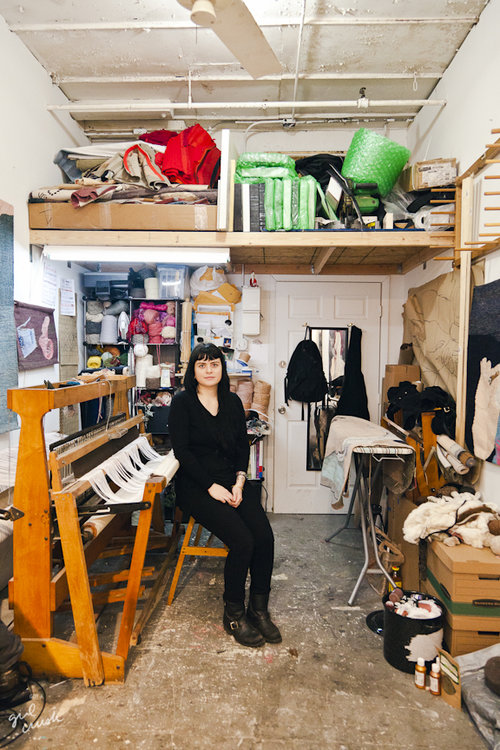
- Born: 1985 (age 40–41); Cape Cod, MA
- Education: 2009 MFA: Tyler School of Art, Philadelphia, PA, 2007 BFA: Massachusetts College of Art and Design, Boston, MA
- Website: erinmriley.com

Erin M. Riley (born 1985) is a Brooklyn-based artist whose work focuses on women and women's issues primarily in hand-woven hand dyed wool tapestries. Riley's work challenges society's comfort level by displaying shocking images including nudity, drugs, violence, self harm, sexuality, and menstruation.

== Early life ==
As a middle child and an introvert, Riley spent much of her childhood alone doing hobbies like art and reading. Her biggest inspirations are Louise Bourgeois's works and personal story.

She graduated with a BFA in fibers in 2007 from Massachusetts College of Art and Design, and with a MFA in fibers in 2009 from Tyler School of Art.

== Career ==
Riley first learned how to sew in a Home Economics class in high school. Her attraction to the craft prompted her to receive her first sewing machine on her next birthday, which she still owns. All of Riley's work Is created on a floor loom with wool hand dyed by Riley. She utilizes social media platforms like Facebook, Instagram, and Tumblr, gathering pictures she compiles into different folders coupled with research to create art for her exhibitions. She uses these images as a reference to create her tapestries directly from the computer rather than sketching the design on paper before hand; however, she does takes notes for each piece in a journal and her phone's notes.

Her 2010 "Nudes" series appropriates images posted to social media, which Riley has recreated in her medium.

...guns, syringes, bongs, vomit, sex, cars crashing, no topic is too much to be recreated on Erin’s loom.

Her work was shown during the 2015 Art Basel Miami week at Miami Projects and the KITH Homage exhibit concurrently. In 2013, Erin M. Riley was among eight women artists featured in Seattle-based Brian Ohno Gallery's exhibition entitled "Get Naked," which focused on works relating to the female body and sexuality. Also in 2013, her work was shown at Philadelphia's Paradigm Gallery and the Joseph Gross Gallery at the University of Arizona.

== Artworks ==
Riley creates tapestries based on her memories, fears, and past traumas to show the struggle of finding ones own identity. One of Riley’s more popular tapestries is a work of art depicting a young woman sitting on the floor burning a photograph that appears to be her younger self surrounded by children's toys. The tapestry titled, Why Now?, was created in 2021. Such graphics of her sudden expression, had Riley's mother question “why now?” which was the inspiration of this tapestry. Why Now? was displayed at a group exhibition show by Arsenal Contemporary Art New York called "Material Knowledge".

== Exhibitions ==
Exhibitions

- Art Basel Miami Beach: Meridians; P.P.O.W Gallery, Miami Beach Convention Center, Miami Beach, FL, 2022
- The Consensual Reality of Healing Fantasies, P.P.O.W Gallery, New York, NY, 2021
- A Reminder of Being There, Jonathan Hopson Gallery, Houston, TX, 2020
- Used Tape, P.P.O.W Gallery, New York, NY, 2018
- Head On, Never Apart, Montreal, QC, Canada, 2017
- Simple, Hashimoto Contemporary, San Francisco, CA, 2017
- 18/bi/f/ma, Brilliant Champions, Brooklyn, NY, 2016
- Anew, Hashimoto Contemporary, San Francisco, CA, 2016
- Darkness Lies Ahead, Joshua Liner Gallery, New York, NY, 2015
- The Pain Comes in Waves, OGAARD Gallery, Oakland, CA, 2014
- Crimson Landslide, Space 1026, Philadelphia, PA, 2014
- Undo, University of Wisconsin Gallery, Oshkosh, WI, 2013
- Show Me More, Guerrero Gallery, San Francisco, CA, 2013
- Crush, Extension Gallery, Boston, MA, 2012
- Forgotten in a File, Guerrero Gallery, San Francisco, CA, 2012
- Erin M Riley, Fleisher Art Memorial, Philadelphia, PA, 2011
- Graphic, Central Utah Arts Center, Ephraim, UT, 2011
- Erin M Riley: New Works, Guerrero Gallery, San Francisco, CA, 2010
- Daddy Issues, Helene Davis Gallery, Artspace, Richmond, VA, 2010

== Awards ==
- Finalist, Burke Prize 2021, MAD Museum, New York, NY American Academy of Arts and Letters, Art Purchase Program United States Artists Fellowship, Craft, 2021
- NYSCA/NYFA Artist Fellowship, Crafts/Sculpture, 2020
- Ruth and Harold Chenven Foundation Grant, New York, NY, 2012
- Vermont Studio Center Artist-in-Residence Full Fellowship, Johnson, VT, 2011
- Artist-in-Residence at the McColl Center for Art + Innovation in Charlotte, NC, 2011
- Kittredge Foundation Grant Recipient, Cambridge, MA, 2011
- Best in Show, Radius 250, Artspace, Richmond, VA, 2009
- Project Completion Grant, Tyler School of Art, Philadelphia, PA, 2009
- Graduate Academic Tuition Assistantship, Tyler School of Art, Elkins Park, PA, 2008
- Graduate Academic Tuition Assistantship, Tyler School of Art, Elkins Park, PA, 2007
- Marilyn Pappas Award, Massachusetts College of Art and Design, Boston, MA, 2007
- Barbara L. Kuhlman Foundation, Inc. Fiber Scholarship, Willet, NY, 2006
- Barbara L. Kuhlman Foundation, Inc. Fiber Scholarship, Willet, NY, 2005
