= Alma Eikerman =

American jeweler and metalsmith (1908–1995)

Alma Rosalie Eikerman
- Alma Eikerman
- Born: May 16, 1908; Pratt, Kansas, U.S.
- Died: January 3, 1995 (aged 86); Bloomington, Indiana, U.S.
- Known for: Silversmith and jewelry designer
- Awards: Indiana Governor's Arts Award

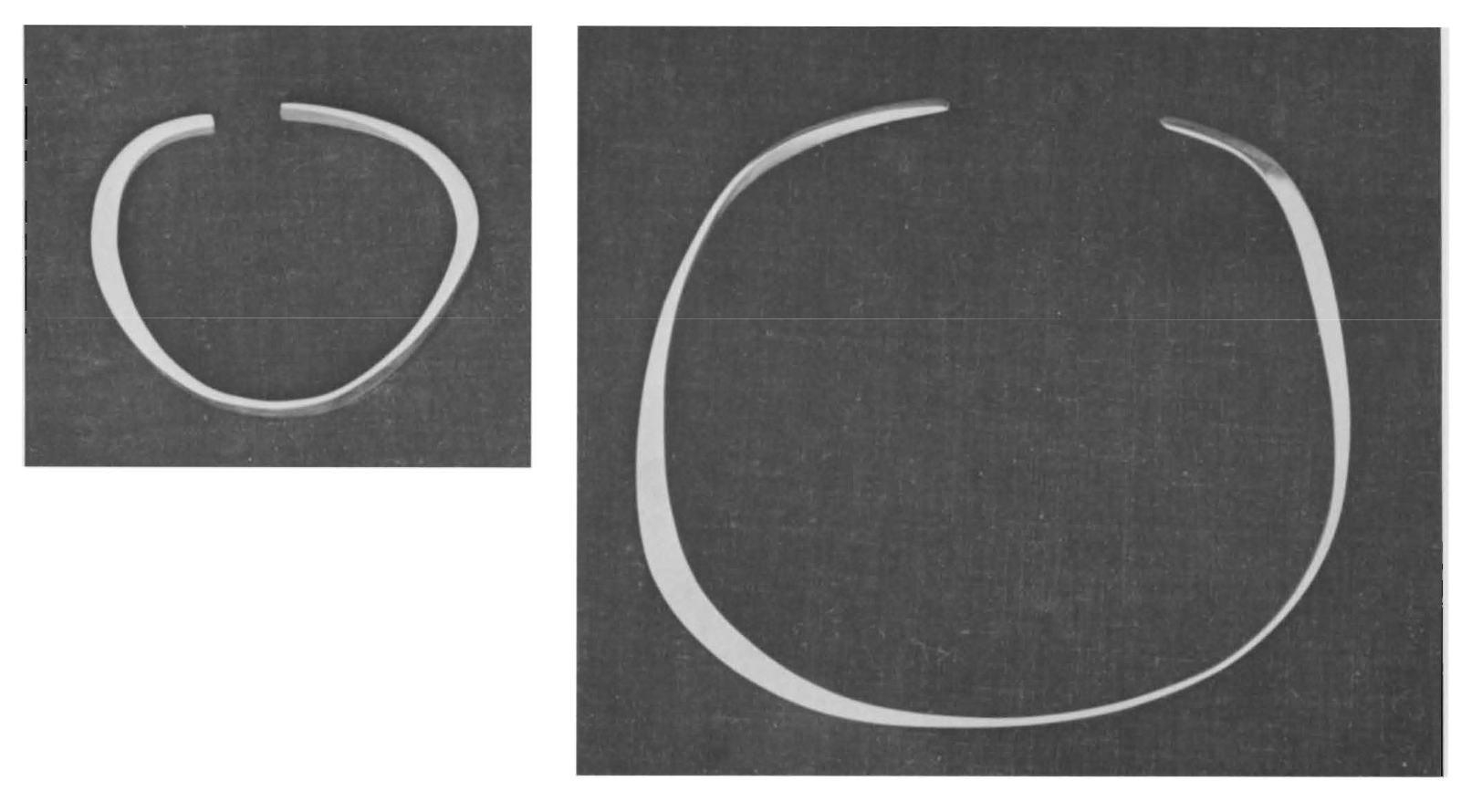
Hammered forms, American Metal Work, 1976

Alma Rosalie Eikerman (May 16, 1908 – January 3, 1995) was an American metalsmith, silversmith, and jewelry designer who was instrumental in building the metals program at Indiana University, of which she retired Distinguished Professor Emeritus. She was a founding member of the Society of North American Goldsmiths and studied under several internationally renowned metalsmiths, such as Karl Gustav Hansen. Eikerman's work has appeared in over 200 exhibitions, including Objects: USA at the Smithsonian Institution.

== Early years and education ==
Alma Rosalie Eikerman was born in rural Pratt, Kansas, one of seven children. Eikerman's parents were creative in their own right: her mother designed clothing and hats while her father built additions onto their home and farm. She began her undergraduate education at Kansas State University during the onset of the Great Depression. She worked as a waitress throughout her time as an undergraduate, making 35 cents per hour.

In 1934, Eikerman earned her undergraduate degree in history, literature, and language from Kansas State. She began her career as a public school music and art teacher in Pratt, Kansas and in Winfield, Kansas.

After six years of teaching in public schools, Eikerman enrolled in graduate studies at University of Kansas, where she studied design, painting, and took her first jewelry course. In 1942, Eikerman transferred to Columbia University in New York City to complete her graduate degree in painting, design, art history, and metalsmithing.

== Career ==
After obtaining her graduate degree from Columbia University, Eikerman returned to Kansas to teach jewelry design and silversmithing at Wichita State University. It was during this time that Eikerman developed her skills in metalsmithing and moved away from strict jewelry design. Shortly after beginning her work at Wichita State University, Eikerman worked for the Red Cross, serving in Italy during World War II (1944–1945.) It was this European experience that exposed Eikerman to Florentine jewelers, which would foreshadow much of her later professional interests. After the war, Eikerman returned to Wichita State University to teach.

In 1947, after returning to the U.S., she was asked to join the faculty at Indiana University. Eikerman originally taught watercolor painting, design, drawing, and jewelry. In the jewelry and metalsmithing courses, she taught ten to twelve undergraduate students and three to four graduate students. Eikerman would remain professor in the metals program at Indiana University until her retirement in 1978.

Her notable students include Helen Shirk, Marjorie Schick, Susan Ewing, Cindy Eid, Lin Stanionis, Marilyn da Silva, and Jack da Silva.

=== Work abroad ===
Her dedication to the development of the program and the students led Eikerman to travel often, gain new skills, and make new connections with other metalsmiths. She pursued opportunities to study with renown metalsmiths and silversmiths around the world. She participated in a Handy and Harmon workshop at the Rhode Island School of Design, led by Erik Fleming, who she would later study with in Stockholm. Eikerman's experience at this workshop precipitated her later travels abroad and apprenticeships.

In 1950, Eikerman went on sabbatical from Indiana University to apprentice in all over the world. She was accepted to study with Karl Gustav Hansen in his Kolding, Denmark, studio where she worked with master craftsman Henrick Boesen. Later, Eikerman would move to Stockholm to study under Erik Fleming; Munich to work with Michael Wiler; and Paris to work with Cubist sculptor Ossip Zadkine.

When she returned from Europe, Eikerman introduced European hollowware techniques, including teapots and serving dishes, to the jewelry and metalsmithing program at Indiana University.

=== Associations and exhibitions ===
In 1970, she founded the Society of North American Goldsmiths. Eikerman was an active member in the College Art Association, Indiana Artist Craftsmen, and World's Craft Council.

Throughout her lifetime Eikerman's work has appeared in over 200 exhibitions, including Objects: USA at the Smithsonian Institution. The Smithsonian exhibit traveled to 25 U.S. states and 11 European countries. Her work was featured in the Museum of Contemporary Crafts in New York City. Prices for her work varied between hundreds to thousands of dollars.

Eikerman worked on several side projects, including 1980 design plans for a home in Bloomington, Indiana. The house featured white walls, red carpeting, and cathedral ceilings.

== Honors and awards ==
Eikerman received many honors and prestigious awards. She received the honor of Distinguished Professor from Indiana University in 1976 and retired as Distinguished Professor Emeritus in 1978.

Throughout her career, Eikerman received grants from the Carnegie Foundation and National Endowment for the Arts.

In 1993, Eikerman received the American Craft Council's Gold Medal. In the same year, she was honored with an Indiana Governor's Arts Award for her contributions to arts education by then governor of Indiana, Evan Bayh. In 1980, the College of Arts and Sciences Alumni Association bestowed Eikerman with a Distinguished Teaching Award in the Fine Arts.

Eikerman was dedicated to her students, many of which went on to become successful artists. In 1981, she received the distinguished teaching award from the IU College of Arts and Sciences Graduate School Alumni Association. Later in 1986, Eikerman accepted a Doctor of Fine Arts from Miami University.

== Death and legacy ==
Eikerman died in Bloomington, Indiana on January 3, 1995. In her honor, the Alma Eikerman Jewelry Design and Silversmithing Fellowship was created at Indiana University Bloomington. Eikerman is widely credited with making the metals program in the Fine Arts Department of Indiana University into one of the best in the country.
