= Paul J. Smith (arts administrator) =

American curator (1931–2020)

- Born: September 8, 1931
- Died: April 26, 2020 (aged 88)

Paul J. Smith (September 8, 1931 – April 26, 2020) was an arts administrator, curator, and artist based in New York. Smith was professionally involved with the art, craft, and design fields since the early 1950s and was closely associated with the twentieth-century studio craft movement in the United States. He joined the staff of the American Craftsmen's Council (ACC, now the American Craft Council) in 1957, and in 1963 was appointed Director of the Museum of Contemporary Crafts (later renamed the American Craft Museum, now the Museum of Arts and Design), a position he held for the next 25 years. In September 1987, he assumed the title of director emeritus and continued to work as an independent curator and consultant for museums, arts organizations, and collectors.

Smith died on April 26, 2020, aged 88.

== Early years and education ==
Raised in Bennington, New York, Smith graduated from Attica High School in 1948 and attended the Art Institute of Buffalo, where he received a scholarship and studied with local artists who served as faculty members, including Charles Burchfield and James Vullo. With an interest in exploring craft skills, he took courses at the local Buffalo YWCA craft program, where he later taught ceramic classes. He also took a few classes at the School for American Craftsmen (now the School for American Crafts) at the Rochester Institute of Technology; this interest led to his membership in the organization Buffalo Craftsmen, where he served as president in 1962, and his active involvement with York State Craftsmen, a state organization that held an annual craft fair in Ithaca, New York.

He took a position in the display department of the Flint & Kent department store in 1953, and was appointed Display Director there in 1955.

== Artistic activity ==
During the 1950s, Smith's paintings and other artworks (signed Paul John Smith) were included in several regional exhibitions, including the Western New York Show at the Albright Art Gallery in Buffalo, and the Finger Lakes Show at the Memorial Art Gallery in Rochester. In 1957 he was included in the new talent listing of the magazine Art in America. His jewelry and wood forms were shown in national competitions such as "Fiber, Clay and Metal" (1955–57) at the Saint Paul Gallery and School of Art and the ACC "Young Americans" competitions (1954, 1956, and 1958). In 1956, his work in wood was awarded a Young Americans Certificate of Merit. He was also represented in Craftsmanship in a Changing World (1956), the inaugural exhibition at the Museum of Contemporary Crafts.

From the 1980s, Smith focused on photography, extensively documenting public events in New York and internationally, including the annual West Indian Parade and Coney Island Mermaid Parade. His photo collection also included images of more than 300 artists, collectors, and other individuals involved with the American studio craft movement from 1985 into the first decades of the twenty-first century. In 2015–16, exhibitions of his photographic portraits were mounted at the Fuller Craft Museum and the Arizona State University Art Museum.

== Curatorial career ==
Upon joining the staff of the American Craftsmen's Council in 1957, Smith established a new ACC program for traveling educational exhibitions. Since 1960, when he became officially involved with the museum, he was responsible for organizing and presenting over 200 exhibitions, ranging from surveys of contemporary craft to one-artist retrospectives and innovative thematic exhibitions. Notable theme-focused exhibitions he organized include Cookies and Breads: The Baker's Art] (1966), Designed for Production: The Craftsmen's Approach (1964), The Teapot (1965), The Door (1968), Body Covering (1968), Plastic as Plastic (1969), Objects for Preparing Food (1973), Portable World] (1974), and The Great American Foot (1978). He initiated more than 75 one-artist exhibitions, including retrospectives for Dorothy Liebes (1970) and Peter Voulkos (1978).

Smith also played a pivotal role in opening the American Craft Museum's new facility at 40 W. 53rd Street in the fall of 1986. On that occasion, he curated the exhibition Craft Today: Poetry of the Physical, which toured nationally after its New York premiere. A revised version, Craft Today USA, toured to fifteen European cities under the auspices of the United States Information Agency's (USIA) Arts America Program from 1989 to 1993.

In addition to organizing exhibitions at the museum in New York, he served as a curatorial adviser for a number of other important exhibitions of contemporary craft, including Objects: USA (1969), a survey collection of craft works assembled by gallery owner Lee Nordness that toured in both the United States and Europe; Craft, Art & Religion (1978), the first contemporary craft exhibition to be held at the Vatican; and In Praise of Hands (1978), the first international craft exhibition in Toronto. He also served on the juries of Things People Make (1981) at the Durban Art Gallery in Durban, South Africa; World Glass Now (1982) in Sapporo, Japan; and numerous other international competitions. In 2001, as project director and guest curator for the American Craft Museum, he organized the major exhibition Objects for Use: Handmade by Design.

In early 2020, the Design Museum at the University of California, Davis hosted an exhibition of African, Asian, and South American textiles from Smith's personal collection alongside contemporary work by UC Davis design students. In 2022, his papers were acquired by the Archives of American Art, Smithsonian Institution, and the American Craft Council.

== Other professional activity ==
From the 1960s, Smith served on numerous boards and committees for arts organizations, including Haystack Mountain School of Crafts, Penland School of Crafts, World Craft Foundation, Atlantic Center for the Arts, Boston University Program in Artisanry, Parsons School of Design, the Pilchuck Glass School, Friends of American Art in Religion, and Friends of Fiber Art. He was a trustee of the Louis Comfort Tiffany Foundation and president of the Lenore G. Tawney Foundation.

Smith traveled to 46 countries to lecture, serve on competition juries, participate in conferences, consult with arts organizations, and conduct research for exhibitions. He helped with the planning of the First Congress of Craftsmen in New York (1964), when the World Crafts Council (WCC) was formed, and attended all subsequent WCC conferences. He was also an invited guest for cultural exchange by the governments of India, Germany, Morocco, Australia, Sweden and Finland. Through the USIA, he gave lectures and workshops in Papua New Guinea, Rwanda, and Botswana as well as in Australia and many European cities. As a member of the professional advisory committee for the “Gift to the Nation” Millennium Project by the Friends of Art and Preservation in Embassies, he assisted in assembling a collection of craft works for permanent placement in United States embassies. Smith also advised The Center for U.S-China Arts Exchange at Columbia University from 1995 on their project dealing with ethnic culture in the Yunnan Province, and made three trips to China in 1995, 1997, and 2000.

== Awards and honors ==
In May 1987, the Parsons School of Design of the New School for Social Research awarded Smith an Honorary Doctorate of Fine Arts for his contributions to craft and design education. He was an Honorary Fellow of the American Craft Council, and an Honorary International Member of the Canadian Craft Council (now the Canadian Crafts Federation). The ACC awarded him the 2009 Aileen Osborn Webb Award for Philanthropy in recognition of exceptional curatorial contributions to the craft field. In November 2011, he received a “Legends” Award from the Watershed Center for the Ceramic Arts. Smith was also awarded the Albert Nelson Marquis Lifetime Achievement Award by Marquis Who's Who in 2019.

== Selected publications ==
=== Books and exhibition catalogues ===
Smith produced and edited numerous many exhibition catalogues during his tenure at the Museum of Contemporary Crafts/American Craft Museum.

- Craft Today: Poetry of the Physical. New York, N.Y.: American Craft Museum. 1987.
- Objects for Use: Handmade by Design. New York, NY: H.N. Abrams in association with the American Craft Museum. 2001.
- Masters of Craft: 224 Artists in Fiber, Clay, Glass, Metal and Wood. Pennsylvania: Schiffer Publishing. 2015.

=== Essays and articles ===
- "Standards for Collecting Craft Art," in Craft Art and Religion: Proceedings of the Second International Seminar, 1978 (New York: The Committee of Religion and Art of America, 1979), pp. 49–52.
- "Jurors' Statement," in Hokkaidōritsu Kindai Bijutsukan, et al., World Glass Now '82 (Sapporo: Hokkaido Museum of Modern Art, 1982).
- "A Tribute to Lenore," in Kathleen Nugent Mangan, ed., Lenore Tawney: A Retrospective (New York: American Craft Museum and Rizzoli, 1990), p. 13.
- "Foreword," in Barbara Lovenheim, ed., Breaking Ground: A Century of Craft Art in Western New York (Rochester, N.Y.: Memorial Art Gallery of the University of Rochester, 2010), p. 7.
- "Toshiko Takaezu: Six Decades," in Peter Held, et al., The Art of Toshiko Takaezu: In the Language of Silence (Chapel Hill, NC: University of North Carolina Press, 2011), pp. 13–17.
- Contributed to Caroline M. Hannah, "An 'Exploding Craft Market,' 1945–1969," in Jeannine Falino, ed., Crafting Modernism: Midcentury American Art and Design (New York: Abrams; Museum of Arts and Design, 2011), pp. 141–143.
- "Formative Years: From Korea to America," in Jane Milosch, ed., Chunghi Choo and Her Students: Contemporary Art and New Forms in Metal (Stuttgart: Arnoldsche Art Publishers, 2020).

=== Oral history interviews ===
- Columbia University Libraries Digital Program (2010). "Oral history interview with Paul J. Smith, conducted by Richard Polsky, 1990. Columbia University Libraries: Oral Histories Portal: Collection Overview". oralhistoryportal.library.columbia.edu.
- "Oral history interview with Paul J. Smith, 2010 April 19-20, conducted by Lloyd E. Herman | Archives of American Art, Smithsonian Institution". www.aaa.si.edu.
- "Oral history interview with Paul J. Smith, conducted by Colin E. Fanning, 24 April 2013. Bard Graduate Center Craft, Art and Design Oral History Project, Bard Graduate Center". bgccraftartdesign.org.

=== Oral history interviews conducted by Smith ===
- "Oral History interviews with Ed Rossbach and Katherine Westphal, 1997 | Archives of American Art, Smithsonian Institution". www.aaa.si.edu.
- "Oral history interview with Susan Peterson, 2004 March 1 | Archives of American Art, Smithsonian Institution". www.aaa.si.edu.
- "Oral history interview with Alice Kagawa Parrott, 2005 July 10 | Archives of American Art, Smithsonian Institution". www.aaa.si.edu.
- "Oral history interview with John Mason, 2006 August 28 | Archives of American Art, Smithsonian Institution". www.aaa.si.edu.
- "Oral history interview with Mark Lindquist, 2009 August 12 | Archives of American Art, Smithsonian Institution". www.aaa.si.edu.
- "Oral history interview with Lloyd E. Herman, 2010 Sept. 21 | Archives of American Art, Smithsonian Institution". www.aaa.si.edu.

=== Published features or interviews ===
- "Current news of the Museum of Contemporary Crafts". ACC Outlook. 4 (5): 1–2. October 1963.
- "An Interview with Paul J. Smith". Museum News. 50 (6): 15–19. 1972.
- Kehlmann, Robert (1987). "Consummate Connoisseur". American Craft. 47 (5): 50–55.
- "Remembering the American Craft Museum". Studio Potter. 32 (1): 3–16. 2003.
- Ramljak, Suzanne (2007). "Interview: Paul J. Smith". Metalsmith. 27 (5): 20–23.
- Lovelace, Joyce (2011). "Who Was Aileen Osborn Webb?". American Craft. 71 (4): 47–49.

== Archival sources ==
- The Paul J. Smith Papers, 1955–2011, Archives of American Art, Smithsonian Institution, Washington, D.C.
- The American Craft Council Library and Archives, American Craft Council, Minneapolis, Minnesota.
