= Ka Kwong Hui =

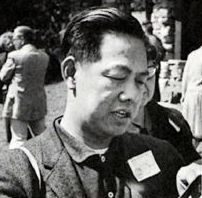
- Born: 1922; Canton (now Guangzhou), China
- Died: October 17, 2003 (aged 80–81); New Jersey, U.S.
- Other name: Hui Ka-Kwong
- Occupations: Potter, ceramist, educator
- Spouse: Eva Bouzard

Ka Kwong Hui, also known as Hui Ka-Kwong (1922–2003) is a Chinese-born American potter, ceramist and educator. He is known for his fine art pottery work, a fusion of Chinese and American styles, and his work within the pop art movement.

== Early life, immigration and education ==
Ka Kwong Hui was born in 1922 in Canton (now Guangzhou), China. He attended Shanghai Academy of Fine Arts (SAFA), and the Kwong Tung School of Art. He apprenticed in sculpture under Cheng Ho.

In 1948, Hui immigrated to the United States to study art at Pond Farm Workshop under Marguerite Wildenhain and Frans Wildenhain. After a period of study with Wildenhains, Hui moved to attend ceramic classes at Alfred University. He graduated from Alfred University (BFA 1951, MFA 1952).

== Career ==
After graduate school, he moved to the New York City-area to teach at Brooklyn Museum Art School (BMAS). Hui later became the head of the ceramics department at BMAS. He also taught art courses at Douglass College, Rutgers University, and the Haystack Mountain School of Crafts. He had notable students, including Jim Agard, and Stephen De Staebler.

From 1964 to 1965, Hui collaborated with pop artist Roy Lichtenstein on a series of ceramics. Hui and Lichtenstein had worked at Rutgers University together. Hui created six bisque female mannequin heads with Ben Day dots for Lichtenstein. The ceramics work with Lichtenstein influenced Hui's own artwork, and resulted in his own explorations within the pop art movement. Unlike Lichtenstein's work within the pop art movement, Hui did not make commercial products, but rather focused on using bright colors and symmetry.

In the 1990s, Hui created a series of bird-shaped sculptures in a green glaze, in reference to the Shang dynasty.

== Death and legacy ==
When Hui retired, he moved to Caldwell, New Jersey. He died on October 17, 2003.

Hui's work can be found in public museum collections including Brooklyn Museum, Everson Museum of Art, The Newark Museum of Art, Alfred Ceramic Art Museum, and Museum of Arts and Design.

In 1997, he was honored as a Fellow by the American Craft Council (ACC). Hui's work was part of the notable Objects: USA 2020 traveling art exhibition, which highlighted the American studio craft movement and paid tribute to the groundbreaking Objects: USA (1969).
