= Chair Standing on its Head (2001) =

2001 sculpture by Wendell Castle

Chair Standing on its Head is a sculptural trompe l’oeil piece created in 2001 by artist Wendell Castle (1932-2018). The sculpture was accepted into the collection at the Memorial Art Gallery (MAG) in Rochester, NY, and is currently displayed alongside the gallery’s other trompe l’oeil pieces.

== Description and interpretation ==
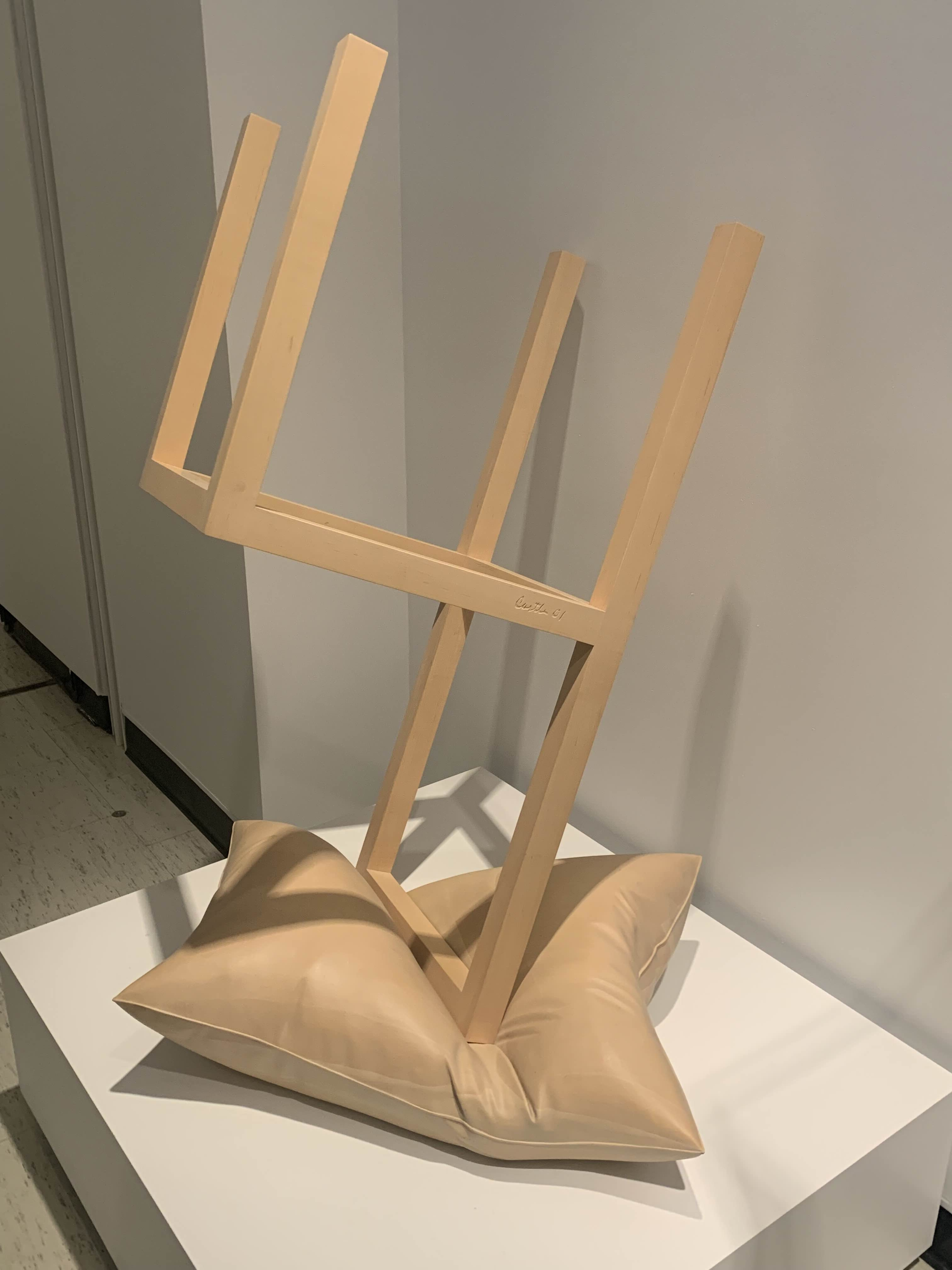
Chair Standing on its Head by Wendell Castle, 2001.

Wendell Castle’s Chair Standing on its Head is composed of two primary objects—a minimalist, stick-figure chair and a pillow—and depicts the chair positioned on top of the pillow.

The piece contains an illusionistic quality known as the trompe l’oeil effect, a French term directly meaning “deceives the eye”. This effect is a successful deception of the viewers’ perception created by the artist through a particular choice between the object(s) literal context, and some feature of the work’s composition.

== Inspiration ==
Chair Standing on its Head, as well as all of Wendell Castle’s sculptural furniture pieces, are products of the American Studio Craft Movement, which drew heavily on from the British Arts and Crafts Movement that originated in mid-19th century Britain. The birth of the Arts and Crafts Movement was in response to the Industrial Revolution’s standardization of manufactured items for ease of mass production, which resulted in artists and craftsmen creating pieces of everyday objects that focused on creating additional decorative aspects while maintaining the objects’ functionality. The American Studio Craft Movement adopted the fundamental values of the Arts and Crafts Movement, and in particular focused on the exploration of fine art and artistic individuality in conjunction with the main tenets of the Arts and Crafts Movement. Castle was and still is recognized as one of the figures who spearheaded the movement with his furniture pieces, and was known to have redefined traditional craftsmanship through innovative techniques and sculptural forms, as well as contributed to Studio Craft Movement’s foundational philosophy of blending craft with fine art.

== Process ==
Castle utilized the stack lamination method in his wooden sculpture work, a technique traditionally used in carpentry. Stack lamination involves bonding wood blocks together and then sculpting this “stack". The fluidity and biomorphic forms of Castle’s wooden sculptural pieces is attributed to this method, allowing him to construct smooth curves, as detailed in the pillow sculpted in Chair Standing on its Head, out of wood.
