= Alma Lesch =

American fiber artist (1917–1999)

- Born: Alma Wallace; March 12, 1917; Kevil, Kentucky U.S.
- Died: May 15, 1999 (aged 82)
- Resting place: Paducah, Kentucky U.S.
- Known for: Fiber Arts

Alma Lesch (March 12, 1917 – May 15, 1999) was an American fiber artist known for her fiber portraits. She was "the undisputed grande dame of Kentucky textile arts." A historic marker notes her achievements in Shepherdsville, Kentucky where Lesch lived and had her studio. Lesch's quilt, Bathshebas Bedspread, was included in the Objects: USA exhibit in 1969, which was organized by S.C. Johnson and Son.

== Early life ==
Lesch began her first quilt at the age of five, completing it seven years later. She graduated from Murray State University in 1941 and earned a master's degree in education from the University of Louisville in 1962.

== Career ==
Lesch taught at the Louisville School of Art and the University of Louisville. She also taught at the Haystack Mountain School of Crafts and Arrowmont School of Arts and Crafts.

Her style frequently used found objects, quilting of personal garments, and embroidery in her works. Her fiber portraits are fabric collages made from antique clothing, however they intentionally exclude the subject's face and limbs, allowing the viewer to imagine the subject. She pioneered this style of portrait in the 1960s, in which she arranged "clothing stitched on to a quilt as though they were positioned for a portrait." Although her contemporary, Marilyn Pappas, used a similar technique, Lesch's portraits are unique in that they touch on the themes of her life lived in Kentucky, including farming, social manners, and folk art.

Lesch influenced other artists such as Jane Burch Cochran. She was named a Master Craftsman by the World Craft Council in 1974 and a Fellow of the Kentucky Guild of Artists and Craftsmen in 1986. She won the Kentucky Governor's Award for Lifetime Contribution to Visual Arts in 1987.

== Solo exhibitions ==
- 1963: The Signature Shop, Atlanta, GA, USA
- 1964: The Arts Club, Louisville, KY, USA
- 1964: Oakland City College, Oakland City, IN, USA
- 1965: Jewish Community Center, Louisville, KY, USA
- 1967: Austin Peay State College, Clarksville, TN, USA
- 1968: University of Kentucky, Lexington, KY, USA
- 1969: The cloth: Textiles on Biblical themes, Speed Art Museum, Louisville, KY, USA
- 1972: Craft Alliance Gallery, St. Louis, MO, USA
- 1976: Society of Arts and Crafts, Boston, MA, USA
- 1981: Alma Lesch: Fabric collage portraits and other works, Danville, KY, USA
- 1989: Alma Lesch, ArtsSpace, Louisville, KY, USA
- 1985: Alma Lesch: A retrospective, Liberty Gallery, Louisville, KY, USA
- 1997: Alma Wallace Lesch: Master maker, Kentucky Museum of Art and Craft
- 2006: Alma Lesch: A life in fabric, Louisville, KY, USA

== Collections ==
- Speed Art Museum, Louisville, Kentucky, USA
- American Craft Museum, New York, NY, USA
- Flint Institute of Art, Flint, MI, USA
- Johnson Collection of Contemporary Crafts
- Evansville Museum of Art, Evansville, IN, USA
- Bridwell Art Library, University of Louisville, Louisville, KY, USA
- Citizen's Bank, Glasgow, KY, USA

Owensboro Fine Art Museum, KY 'Lay of the Land: Kentucky Landscape' 1983 commission gifted from Meidinger Tower, Louisville KY

== Works and publications ==
- Lesch, Alma Wallace (1961). A Resource Unit on Vegetable Dyeing for a High School Art Class (M. Ed. thesis). Louisville, KY: Ekstrom Library, University of Louisville. OCLC 41381086.
- Lesch, Alma (1962). The American textile industry and some of its products. Louisville, KY: University of Louisville. OCLC 7120995.
- Lesch, Alma (1970). Vegetable Dyeing: 151 Color Recipes for Dyeing Yarns and Fabrics with Natural Materials (1974 revised ed.). Newton Abbot: David and Charles. ISBN 978-0-71-536652-3. OCLC 16281792.
