= Marilyn da Silva =

American metalsmith, sculptor, professor (b. 1952)

- Born: Marilyn Grrevank; 1952 (age 73–74); Akron, Ohio, U.S.
- Education: Bowling Green State University, Indiana University Bloomington
- Occupations: Silversmith, metalsmith, sculptor, jeweler, professor
- Spouse: Jack da Silva

Marilyn da Silva (née Grrevank; born 1952) is an American sculptor, metalsmith, jeweler, and educator. She teaches and serves as a department head at the California College of the Arts in the San Francisco Bay Area. Da Silva has won numerous awards including honorary fellow by the American Craft Council (2007).

== Early life and education ==
Marilyn da Silva was born in 1952 in Akron, Ohio.

She attended Bowling Green State University and graduated with a B.S. degree in 1974. She continued her study at Indiana University Bloomington and graduated with a M.F.A. degree in 1977. In graduate school she worked under Alma Eikerman. She is married to jeweler and silversmith Jack da Silva, whom she met in graduate school.

== Career ==
Da Silva is known for her technique of added color to metalwork using a colored pencil. Her sculptures often feature imagery of objects such as birds, rabbits, books, and houses.

Da Silva is a professor and the department head of the jewelry and metal arts program at California College of the Arts, since 1987. She previously taught at Bowling Green State University from 1978 to 1987; and has taught workshops at Penland School of Craft, Haystack Mountain School of Craft, Arrowmont School of Arts and Crafts, and the Mendocino Art Center.

Da Silva is an Honorary Fellow of the American Craft Council since 2007; she was awarded Master Metalsmith by the National Ornamental Metal Museum in 1999; and she was awarded the Master of the Medium award from the James Renwick Alliance in 2017.

Her work can be found in the museum collections at the Arkansas Arts Center (also known as the Arkansas Museum of Fine Arts), the National Ornamental Metal Museum, the Oakland Museum of California, and the National Museum of Modern and Contemporary Art in Seoul.
