= Sari Dienes =

Hungarian-born American artist (1898–1992)

- Born: Sarolta Maria Anna Chylinska; October 8, 1898; Debreczen, Hungary
- Died: May 25, 1992 (aged 93); Stony Point, New York
- Website: saridienes.org

Sari Dienes (8 October 1898 – 25 May 1992) was a Hungarian-born American artist. During a career spanning six decades she worked in a wide range of media, creating paintings, drawings, prints, sculptures, ceramics, textile designs, sets and costumes for theatre and dance, sound-art installations, mixed-media environments, music and performance art. Her large-scale 'Sidewalk Rubbings' of 1953–55 - bold, graphic, geometrical compositions, combining rubbings of manhole covers, subway gratings and other elements of the urban streetscape - signaled a move away from the gestural mark making of Abstract Expressionism towards the indexical appropriation of the environment that would be further developed in Pop art, and exerted a significant influence on Robert Rauschenberg and Jasper Johns.

== Life ==
=== Early life in Europe - 1898–1928 ===
Dienes was born Sarolta Maria Anna Chylinska on 8 October 1898, in Debreczen, Austria-Hungary. Her father, Lovag Gyorgy Chylinski (b.1861), was descended from Irish and Polish nobility. Her mother, Etelka Stegmüller (1870–1932), was of Swiss and German parentage and was a relative of the celebrated opera singer Etelka Gerster (1855–1920).

As a child she studied piano, before turning to dance, training in Budapest with Valéria Dienes (1879–1978), a disciple of Raymond Duncan. In 1919 she became romantically involved with Valéria Dienes’ husband Paul Dienes (1882–1952), a mathematician and poet, who headed a commission to reform university education during Béla Kun’s short-lived Hungarian Soviet Republic. Following the collapse of the revolutionary government, Paul fled to Vienna in 1920, where Sari joined him before moving to Paris. They married in July 1922 and moved to Aberystwyth in Wales, where Paul Dienes was appointed a lecturer in mathematics at Aberystwyth University. In the following year the couple moved to Swansea and then, in 1929, to London, where Paul Dienes headed the mathematics department at Birkbeck College.

=== London and Paris - 1928–1939 ===
Between c.1928 and c.1935 Dienes studied fine art in Paris with Fernand Léger and Amédée Ozenfant at the Académie Moderne, with André Lhote, and with Ozenfant at the Académie Ozenfant. She was appointed assistant director of the Ozenfant Academy of Fine Arts London in 1936. Dienes recruited the school’s first students, Leonora Carrington and Stella Snead, and employed Henry Moore to teach a course in modeling in clay at the school in 1938.

=== New York and Japan - 1939–1960 ===
In September 1939 Dienes travelled to New York for a brief visit but was prevented from returning to Europe by the outbreak of the Second World War. She helped Ozenfant establish his new art school at 208 East 20th Street in New York, where she taught until 1941. With Ozenfant's help, Dienes attempted to find a teaching position for her husband at an American university but was unsuccessful; Paul Dienes remained in England, where he died in 1952. Dienes later taught drawing and composition at the Parsons School of Design and the Brooklyn Museum Art School. Around this time she befriended abstract painters Mark Rothko and Theodoros Stamos, the composer John Cage and choreographer Merce Cunningham. From the mid-1950s Dienes attended D.T. Suzuki’s weekly afternoon lectures on Zen Buddhism at Columbia University together with composers Earle Brown, John Cage and Morton Feldman and Jackson Mac Low, artists Ray Johnson, and Isamu Noguchi, often followed by a soirée at her 57th Street studio.

From 1949 through 1952 she created prints at the Atelier 17 studio.

From the spring of 1957 until December 1958 Dienes lived in Japan, where she studied ceramics with master potter Teruo Hara. Through Noguchi, she befriended the industrial designer Isamu Kenmochi, who wrote that, "Her work has great vision, grandeur rather than beauty: overwhelming by the vigorous power flowing forth from within ... poetry wrung from the body.' She had solo exhibitions in Kyoto and Tokyo.

=== Stony Point/NYC 1961–1992 ===
In 1961 Dienes moved to the Gate Hill Cooperative at Stony Point, New York, a rural community established in 1954 by Paul and Vera Williams. Her neighbors there included John Cage, the writer and potter M.C. Richards, the pianist David Tudor, the ceramicist Karen Karnes, the sculptor David Weinrib, the filmmaker Stan VanDerBeek, and the early music champion LaNoue Davenport. Dienes was a founding member of the woman-owned and operated A.I.R. Gallery founded in 1972, and in 1976 was presented with the International Women’s Year Award for her contributions to the art world. In 1977 Dienes helped establish the downtown pub, The Ear Inn with Rip Hayman and Paco Underhill, which became her New York City home base. Dienes lived at Stony Point until her death in 1992.

== Career ==
=== Pioneer of assemblage ===
A three-month trip to Arizona, Colorado, New Mexico and Utah in 1947 had a profound effect on Dienes' aesthetic, as she later recalled: 'Experiencing the natural formations as pieces of sculpture changed my whole attitude to life, to art.' The stark beauty of the desert landscape, together with her studies of Zen Buddhism, allowed her to see the artistic potential in her surroundings, inspiring her to assemble works of art from found materials. The New York Times review of her show at the Carlebach Gallery in April 1948 noted the inclusion of ‘ingenious surrealist shock objects composed of driftwood and sea shell fragments’. She was soon using all manner of natural and man-made detritus in her works. Reviewing her exhibition Found Objects and Constructions at Mills College in The Village Voice in February 1956 John Wilcock listed some of the components of her sculptures: ‘a rusty garbage-can lid, considerably battered; chips off a pine cone which look like ducks on a pond, a mannequin’s leg in a whiskey bottle topped with a seashell; about one-third of a shovel, which looks like a bird; an automobile hubcap, dented by passing trucks; innumerable pieces of well-rounded charred driftwood, burned orange crates, and scorched easels; and an enormous sheet of rusted metal (“we had to cart it home in a taxi”) which resembles a map of ancient Egypt.’

In 1956 Dienes began to construct complex assemblages of glass bottles held together with epoxy resin, which she called 'Bottle Gardens'. The writer and ceramicist M.C. Richards wrote that Dienes' 'bottle sculptures rehearse for us that radiant void of which the sages speak. Forms press forth invisibly. The glass captures their reflections, and we think we see multiple dwellings for a genie, quiet seas for small ships, messengers from floating islands of light and color."

Dienes' pioneering role in assemblage was acknowledged by her inclusion in the American Federation of Arts touring exhibition Art and the Found Object in 1959 and The Art of Assemblage at the Museum of Modern Art, New York in 1961. In 1964 Dienes created an assemblage on a grand scale in her mixed-media installation A Surrounding at the Smolin Gallery, New York, a labyrinth of plastic sheeting, netting, charred wood, ropes, lighting elements and a zebra skin. Dienes continued to work with found materials throughout her career, using driftwood, shells, bones, seed pods, bottles and mirrored glass, tin cans and other scrap metal, and impermanent materials such as flower petals and tumble-dryer lint. Her large-scale installation Bone Fall of 1973, comprising a cascade of animal bones collected over a twenty-five-year period, was later followed by Glass Fall and Shell Fall.

=== Sidewalk Rubbings ===
At a residency at Yaddo artists’ retreat at Saratoga Springs in the spring of 1953, Dienes made a large number of monoprints by taking rubbings from textured surfaces using a printmaker’s brayer. Back in New York in the summer of 1953 she began taking rubbings of the sidewalks, subway gratings and other urban features on very large sheets of paper or Webril. As she told The Village Voice in 1956: ‘About 5 o’clock on Sunday mornings is the best time because there aren’t as many hecklers, and traffic is light. I take those big sheets of paper that photographers use but I have to keep a firm hold or they blow away. Sometimes I take rubbings of cracks in the sidewalk and sometimes I take rubbings of rubbings.’ Dienes sometimes enlisted the aid of younger artists Rachel Rosenthal, Cy Twombly, Robert Rauschenberg and Jasper Johns. Johns later recalled assisting Dienes: ‘After finishing my work at a bookstore on 57th Street, I used to visit Sari, who lived nearby. After midnight we would go out on 6th Avenue and she would work over the cracked street and various cast-iron manhole covers. I was responsible for keeping the sometimes enormous sheets of fabric or paper that she used from blowing away.’ ‘She was very uninhibited, I thought. People would come up and ask what was going on, and she would talk as she continued to work, in the middle of the street.’ Dienes’ ‘Sidewalk Rubbings’ were featured in solo exhibitions at the Betty Parsons Gallery in April–May 1954 and November–December 1955, in the windows of the New York department store Bonwit Teller in July 1955, and at the Contemporaries Gallery in New York in 1959. Reviewing an exhibition of Dienes' work at Gump's Gallery in San Francisco in 1957, noted critic Alfred Frankenstein described her rubbings as follows: 'A circular saw and various spiky forms lead to a sunflower as eloquent as any of Van Gogh's, but most of the pictures are not as specifically representational as that. Manhole covers, perforated steel plates, boards, sidewalk grilles and other surfaces have been drawn upon for a series of designs laying stress on the movement of rectilinear and circular forms and on exquisitely sensitive resonances of color and tone.

=== Textile designs ===
Dienes’ rubbings technique was well suited to surface printing techniques and in the 1950s she enjoyed a successful career as a textile designer, producing designs for L. Anton Maix Fabrics, the Associated American Artists Galleries and Jack Lenor Larsen. Her designs Tree Saw and Circles, the latter created by the imprint of egg cartons, were included in the exhibition Design by the Yard: Textile Printing from 800 to 1956 at the Cooper Union in New York in 1956.

=== Fluxus and performances ===
Dienes was closely associated with many of the artists around Fluxus, including Yoko Ono and Nam June Paik, and collaborated on numerous musical performances and theatrical events. In 1964 she performed in Hruslk an opera by Dick Higgins and Philip Corner at the Café Au Go Go in New York. Throughout the 1970s she contributed works to the Annual Avant Garde Festivals of New York organized by Charlotte Moorman, and collaborated with Charlie Morrow, Simone Forti, Rip Hayman, Jackson MacLow, Pauline Oliveros and Alison Knowles.

=== Ceaseless experimentation ===
Dienes continued to experiment with materials into her seventies and eighties, exploring such divergent paths as the emergent colour Xerox technology and painting on snow. Interviewed in 1980, she expressed a completely open attitude to the creative process: ‘In the 1930s, all I cared about was technique. I studied drawing every day from 9 to 5. I've completely changed. My art is very much like having a baby. You can't plan how big it will be or what color eyes it will have. It is what it is. Technique can be taught, but knowing the human anatomy will not make you a better artist.’ In the 1980s she used Styrofoam packaging elements as printings blocks or sprayed them with metallic paint, delighting in the sounds and smells as the chemical reaction caused the Styrofoam to sputter and melt. She believed that even the humblest of materials could be transformed into a work of art: ‘Spirit lives in everything. It has no age, no color, no sex.’

=== New Generations of Influence ===
Dienes was an enormous influence on younger artists than her like Carolee Schneemann and Ray Johnson who, in turn, have now become important influencers of young artists today interested in body performance and social media, respectively. Dienes' innoivative procedures have enjoyed a recent resurgence with the book, "Sari Dienes: Who I Am?!", edited by Barbara Pollitt.
