= Petur Tryggvi =

Icelandic gold and silversmith (born 1956)

Petur Tryggvi Hjalmarsson
- Born: 24 January 1956; Ísafjörður, Iceland
- Died: 8 March 2021 (aged 65)
- Education: Guldsmedehøjskolen
- Occupations: Goldsmith, Silversmith
- Employer: Self-employed
- Parent: Hjálmar Torfason

Pétur Tryggvi Hjalmarsson was an Icelandic gold and silversmith.

== Background ==
Tryggvi was born in Ísafjörður in Iceland. He was first trained in the goldsmith shop of his father Hjálmar Torfason in Reykjavík. He graduated from the Guldsmedehøjskolen (Goldsmith's High School) in Copenhagen in 1983.

== Work ==
He opened a workshop in Reykjavík in 1985, and moved to Denmark in 1988; his shop was in Gentofte, near Copenhagen. In 2001 he moved back to Iceland, setting up shop in his home town of Ísafjörður.

Tryggvi was a member of the Exhibition Group of Danish Silversmiths and has several works exhibited at the Koldinghus Museum for Silverware in Kolding Castle, Jutland, Denmark, and at the Danish Museum of Art and Design, Copenhagen. He has made the church silver for five churches in Iceland, including for Áskirkja in Reykjavík.

Tryggvi's work has been exhibited at the Herning Art Museum; at the Victoria & Albert Museum, London; at the Crafts Council, London; and at the Galleri Mountain, Denmark.

Director of the Koldinghus Museum, Poul Dedenroth-Schou, explaining why Tryggvi had won the 'Karl Gustav Hansen Prize' in 2010, said that Tryggvi "had attracted attention with his notable jewellery in gold and precious stones, which is also exported to Germany and Japan", as well as working on church silver, "all with a distinctive and powerful idiom". According to Dedenroth-Schou, Tryggve can combine silver with gold, platinum, cement, rusting iron and other materials, and had for many years been a valued member of the "Danish Silversmiths" group.

He died on 8 March 2021.

== Exhibitions ==
Tryggvi has exhibited his work in numerous museums and art galleries since 1979: only the most notable are listed here.

- 2006 Queens Gallery at Kronborg Castle, Helsinore
- 2004 Icelandic Design Museum, Garðabær
- 2003 (and earlier years) Gallery Metal, Copenhagen
- 2002 Silversmiths Gallery, Koldinghus Museum, Denmark
- 2001 Bröhan-Museum, State Museum for Art Nouveau, Art Deco and Functionalism, Berlin
- 2001 (and earlier years) Danish Museum of Art and Design, Copenhagen
- 2000 Kjarvalsstaðir Museum, Reykjavík
- 2000 Herning Art Museum, Herning
- 1999 Finnish Museum of Art and Design, Helsinki
- 1998 Hofburg Museum, Vienna
- 1997 Brøndsalen, Frederiksberg
- 1990 Röhss Museum for Design and Applied Art, Gothenburg Contemporary Swedish Silver, Stockholm
- 1989 Scandinavian Contemporary Art Gallery, Copenhagen
- 1989 'European Design', Tokyo
- 1985 (and earlier years) Art Association Form Ísland, Reykjavík
- 1982 Tuborg Art Association, Copenhagen
- 1979 National Museum of Iceland, Bogasalur, Reykjavík
