= Dorian Zachai =

American fiber artist

- Born: 1932
- Died: 2015 (aged 82–83)
- Known for: Fiber art

Dorian (Dohrn) Zachai (1932 – 2015) was an American fiber artist. Her work was included in the 1963 exhibition Woven Forms at the Museum of Contemporary Crafts in New York City. She is considered an important innovator in the field of fiber art.

== Biography ==
Zachai was born in 1932. She worked in the off-loom weaving style to create sculptures. Her work was included in the 1963 exhibition Woven Forms at the Museum of Contemporary Crafts, the 1969 exhibition Objects: USA at SAAM and the Museum of Contemporary Crafts, and the 1971 exhibition Deliberate Entanglements at the UCLA Art Galleries.

Zachai died in Vermont in 2015.

Her work is in the Museum of Arts and Design and some of her papers are in the Smithsonian Libraries and Archives.

== Legacy ==
The Vermont Studio Center has a Dohrn Zachai Fellowship awarded to female visual artists aged 65 and older.
