= A Chair for My Mother =

1982 children's book by Vera Williams

- Author: Vera Williams
- Illustrator: Vera Williams
- Cover artist: Vera Williams
- Language: English
- Genre: Children's literature
- Publisher: HarperCollins
- Publication date: 1982
- Publication place: United States
- Pages: 32
- ISBN: 0688040748
- Dewey Decimal: [E] 21

A Chair for My Mother is a 1982 Caldecott Honor book by Vera Williams. According to the book's inscription, it was written in memory of the author's mother, Rebecca Poringer Baker. In January 2007, a 25th anniversary edition of the book was released.

A Chair for My Mother is a read-aloud picture story book, written for an audience between ages 4 and 8. Williams uses primary colors in the illustrations that are drawn as if by the young girl in the story.

== Background ==
When Williams was a child, she resented a chair that her mother had bought on an installment plan. Her mother was training to become a nurse, working 12-hour-days, and wanted a chair to relax in. The family had to forgo other purchases to make the payments for the chair. Williams always regretted saying to her mother, "You shouldn't have bought the chair if you couldn't afford it." She drew on that experience to write A Chair for My Mother.

== Summary ==
A girl narrates of her mother, a waitress at a restaurant called the Blue Tile Diner. The narrator sometimes works at the Blue Tile Diner after school and Mama's boss, Josephine, also pays her with coins. Whenever the narrator goes home, she deposits half her earnings into a jar. The narrator's mother and maternal grandmother have also been depositing their own earnings into the same jar.

The family has been saving to buy Mama a soft armchair with rose patterns.

The year prior, the narrator and her mother were on their way home from shopping when their house burned down; even though Grandma and their pet cat had survived, the family lost everything in the blaze. When the narrator and her family later moved to a new apartment, their other relatives, friends, and neighbors teamed up to give them new furniture. Mama then got her job at the Blue Tile Diner where she found the jar.

After an entire year of saving, the jar becomes full. On her day off, Mama deposits the saved coins in the bank, and makes ten dollars. With their new earnings, the family takes the bus to buy the chair they have been saving for. After browsing through four furniture stores, with Grandma even testing the quality of the chairs like Goldilocks, they find the one with the rose patterns.

With their efforts paid off, the narrator and her mother get to sit and relax in their new chair.

== Sequel ==
In 1983, Williams published Something Special for Me, a sequel to A Chair for My Mother, in which the family saves coins for an accordion for the young girl.
