= Paul Hultberg =

American multi-disciplinary artist (1926–2019.)

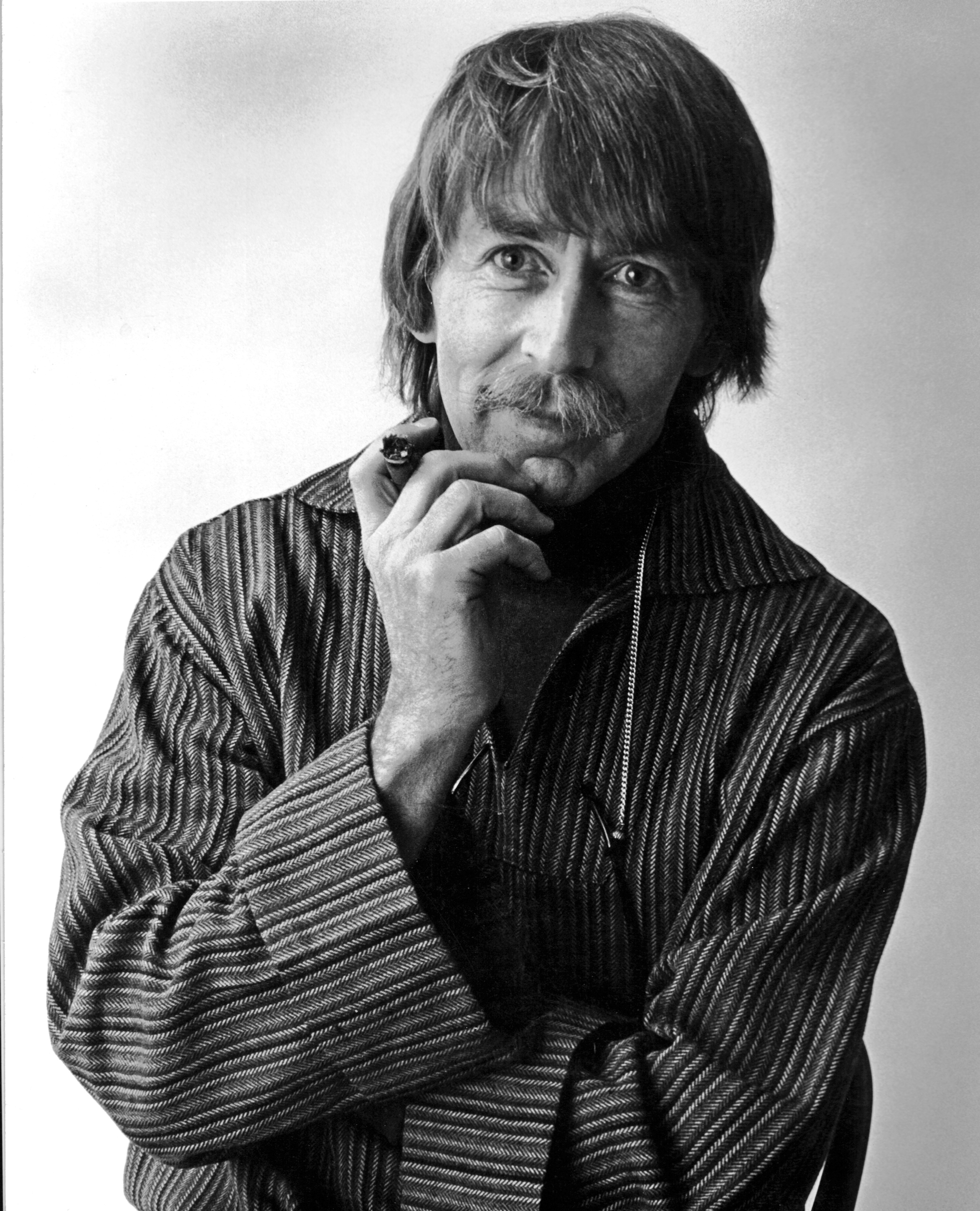
Paul Hultberg in 1985

Paul Hultberg (January 6, 1926 — December 3, 2019) was an American multi-disciplinary artist known for his abstract expressionist architectural murals of vitreous enamel on both copper and steel. He was also a painter, a printmaker and a college professor art instructor, who retired as professor emeritus.

== Early life and education ==
Hultberg was born in 1926 in Oakland, California. He had a sister, Helen, and two brothers, John Hultberg and Don. He attended the University of Southern California funded by the GI Bill, where he studied painting and printmaking under Keith Crown, and Fresno State College.

He went on to study in Mexico City at the Instituto Politécnico Nacional with José Gutierrez, where he also attended classes with Rufino Tamayo and David Alfaro Siqueiros. Gutierrez used synthetic paints, the first acrylics, for use in outdoor murals, which Hultberg got to experiment with prior to their reaching commercial markets. He then moved back to California to start his own mural painting enterprise. He soon moved to New York enrolling in the Brooklyn Museum Art School, where he studied painting and printmaking with Rueben Tam, Gabor Peterdi and Max Ernst. He was eventually hired by then Director, Augustus Peck to teach design, painting and graphics, and helped develop their enameling program. While at the school, he experimented using painting and printmaking techniques with enameling.

== Personal life ==
Hultberg married Ethel Lutsky in 1950. They had four children and remained married until his death in 2019. The couple lived in Brooklyn, NY where Hultberg shared a studio with ceramicist Ka Kwong Hui, until moving in 1956 to the Gate Hill Cooperative, an artist community in Rockland County, New York, founded by faculty and students of Black Mountain College, Asheville, North Carolina. It was Hultberg's friendship with John Cage, the notable avant-garde composer and theorist, that led him and his wife to moving their family to the early counterculture commune where Cage already had residence. Cage introduced Hultberg to the I-Ching and the idea of embracing and incorporating "chance operations" into his work, as pioneered earlier by Duchamp and the Surrealists. One of Hultberg's earliest adaptations of this concept was with a 24-foot mural he created for the exterior of the studio of architect Paul Williams, co-founder of the Gate Hill Cooperative. The 108 individual panels that comprised the mural were arranged according to numbers randomly selected from the phone book.

Hultberg eventually moved his family to Pomona, New York, in 1965 where he and his wife had individual studios and a gallery where they exhibited their own work and that of friends. They maintained their Pomona estate for fifty years until moving to the village of Sauve in the South of France in 2009, where Hultberg spent the remainder of his life. He is survived by his widow and their four children.

== Career ==
Hultberg was lauded as an innovator and adventurous inventor in his medium. His abstract enamels have been compared to works by Clyfford Still, Franz Kline and Jackson Pollock. In addition to the large scale of his murals, he's noted for his use of fire scale and chance oxidation, sgraffito, acid etching and print making techniques. Hultberg's gestural broad strokes and action painting techniques squarely align his vitreous enamels on copper with abstract expressionism. While his opaque enamels on steel are considered in the color field sub-genre, with his later steel works from the 1980's - like his 60 foot "Apple Dapple" commissioned by John Kluge for the Metromedia building, NYC - as hard edge painting. His architectural commissions started in 1959 with enameled steel panels on a four-story escalator, "Stairway to the Stars", for Anheuser-Busch, Tampa, Florida. Other architectural installations included a 45 foot mural on aluminum for Alcoa's offices in the Pan Am Building, NYC, and a 24 foot enamel on copper mural for Columbus Park Towers, NYC. Hultberg's work is represented in the permanent collection of the Museum of Modern Art, in New York, as well as in other museum collections. Hultberg's work was shown at the 1962 Seattle World's Fair and in the Pavilion of American Interiors at the 1964 New York World’s Fair.

The 1959 exhibition, Enamels, at the Museum of Contemporary Craft (now the Museum of Arts and Design) included five of Hultberg's large abstract panels. During that same period he made commissions for Merck International, Dorr-Oliver Corporation, the office doors of the Martha Jackson Gallery, NYC, the lobby doors of The Living Theater, NYC, and exterior paneling for Walden School, Berkeley, California, among others. Hultberg was represented by Lee Nordness between 1968 and 1974. He was included in the 1969 studio craft exhibition that premiered at the Smithsonian, OBJECTS:USA, and its accompanying publication. Hultberg's enamels were considered a major contributing factor to the "vitality and growing intersection of art and craft in America".

Hultberg's work was also included in two exhibitions celebrating the 50th anniversary of the craft exhibit; one at the Racine Art Museum titled OBJECTS REDUX: 50 Years After OBJECTS: USA Defined American Craft. The other, OBJECTS:USA 2020, produced by R & Company gallery in New York, pairing 50 historical artists with 50 contemporary ones. These two shows coincided with a posthumous exhibition of Hultberg's enamel artwork hosted by Moderne Gallery in Philadelphia. The gallery produced a full color print catalog of the entire show, of which a PDF version can still be viewed on their website.

== Publications (select) ==
- OBJECTS:USA 2020; Glen Adamson; The Monacelli Press; 2020; ISBN 978-1580935739
- Rediscovering Paul Hultberg: Abstract Expressionism in Enamel; Alan Rosenberg & Glenn Adamson; Moderne Gallery, 2020
- Little Dreams in Glass and Metal: Enameling in America 1920 to Present; Bernard N. Jazzar & Harold B. Nelson; Enamel Arts Foundation; 2015; ISBN 978-1469626369
- Makers: A History of American Studio Craft; Janet Koplos & Bruce Metcalf; University of North Carolina Press; 2010; ISBN 978-0807834138
- Painting with Fire: Masters of Enameling in America, 1930-1980; Bernard N. Jazzar & Harold B. Nelson; 2006; Long Beach Museum of Art; ISBN 978-0-9712772-8-1
- The Council House; Lee Nordness; Perimeter Press, Inc.; 1980; ISBN 0-937-486-00-0
- Metal Enameling; Polly Rothenberg; Crown Publishers Inc, New York; 1969, 1973 ISBN 0-517-025604
- Step-by-Step Enameling: A Complete Introduction to the Craft of Enameling; William Harper; Golden Press, Western Publication Co.; 1972; ISBN 72-94424
- OBJECTS:USA: Works by Artist-Craftsmen in Ceramic, Enamel, Glass, Metal, Plastic, Mosaic, Wood, and Fiber: Lee Nordness; Thames and Hudson; 1970; ISBN 0-500-59002--8
- Enameling on Metal; Oppi Untract; Chilton Book Company; 1957; ISBN 9780801901669
