= Karl Gustav Hansen =

Danish silversmith (1914–2002)

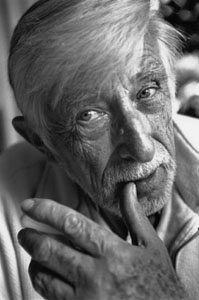
- Karl Gustav Hansen (2014)
- Born: 10 December 1914; Kolding, Denmark
- Died: 21 December 2002 (aged 88)
- Education: Royal Danish Academy of Fine Arts
- Occupations: Silversmith, designer
- Known for: holloware design and craft, jewelry design
- Movement: Scandinavian design
- Awards: Golden Ring of Honour (1982)

Karl Gustav Hansen (1914–2002) was a Danish master silversmith and designer. He is considered a pioneer of Scandinavian silversmith design, and was active during the Scandinavian modern-period.

== Early life ==
Karl Gustav Hansen was born 10 December 1914 in Kolding, Southern Denmark, Denmark. His father Hans Hansen (1884–1940) was a silversmith, specializing in holloware design, and later jewelry and had a silversmithy in the town of Kolding.

== Education and career ==
Starting in 1930, he apprenticed under his father at the Hans Hansen Sølvmedie (English: Hans Hansen Silversmithy) under Einar Olsen (1907–1988). During this time his father started a jewelry line, which Karl Gustav Hansen designed a "future"-themed jewelry series for in 1932.

From 1935 to 1938, he studied under Einar Utzon-Frank at the Royal Danish Academy of Fine Arts (Danish: Det Kongelige Danske Kunstakademi) in Copenhagen. After his father's death in 1940, Hansen returned to Kolding and took over the design leadership at the family silversmithy. Notable students of Hansens include Alma Eikerman, and Dwight Dillon.

In 1982, he was awarded the Golden Ring of Honour by the Association for Goldsmiths’ Art.

Hansen's work can be found in museum collections including the Nationalmuseum, the Metropolitan Museum of Art, the Minneapolis Institute of Art, and the Rhode Island School of Design Museum.

== See also ==
- Household silver
