= Pétur Eyþórsson =

Icelandic wrestler

- Born: 22 July 1978 (age 46); Húsavík, Iceland
- Nationality: Icelandic
- Style: Glima

Other information
- Occupation: Athlete

Pétur Eyþórsson (born 22 July 1978 in Húsavík) is an Icelandic glima, a variation of Scandinavian folk wrestling, champion. He won the glima grettisbelt several times and was voted the best wrestler during the first IGA world championship.

== Awards ==
He was the Glima King of Iceland in 2004, 2005, 2007, 2009, 2010, 2011, and 2012.

== Family ==
He is the son of Eyþór Pétursson, a famous glima wrestler in the 1980s.
