= Helen Shirk =

American jewelry designer (born 1942)

- Born: 1942 (age 83–84); Buffalo, New York, U.S.
- Education: Skidmore College, Indiana University Bloomington
- Known for: jewelry designer and teacher

Helen Shirk (born 1942, Buffalo New York) is an American jewelry designer. She attended Skidmore College and Indiana University Bloomington as well as studying at the Kunsthaandvaerkerskolen in Copenhagen on a Fulbright Scholarship. She taught jewelry and metalwork at San Diego State University from 1975 to 2010, retiring as Professor of Art Emeritus.

Her work is in the Los Angeles County Museum of Art, the Museum of Fine Arts, Houston, the Nelson-Atkins Museum of Art, and the Philadelphia Museum of Art.

In 1999 Shirk became a Fellow of the American Craft Council. In 2017 she received the lifetime achievement award from Society of North American Goldsmiths (SNAG).
