= Objects: USA =

1969 art exhibition

Objects: USA (1969) was a groundbreaking exhibition considered a watershed in the history of the American studio craft movement. It "blurred lines between art and craft, artist and artisan". The exhibition featured a survey collection of craft works by artists from across the United States (including Hawaii). Artists were approached and works chosen by New York gallery owner Lee Nordness and curator Paul J. Smith, the director of the Museum of Contemporary Crafts. The exhibition was funded by S. C. Johnson & Son, which purchased the pieces for the exhibition and later donated many of them to American museums. The Objects: USA exhibition appeared at thirty-three locations in the United States and Europe. The accompanying exhibition catalog Objects: USA (1970) became a classic reference work.

== Exhibition ==
The Objects: USA exhibition premiered at the Smithsonian National Collection of Fine Arts (now the Smithsonian American Art Museum) in Washington, D.C., on October 3, 1969. It appeared at the Museum of Contemporary Crafts (later the American Craft Museum, now the Museum of Arts and Design) in New York City from June 9 to September 3, 1972. Objects: USA eventually traveled to twenty-two museums in American and eleven locations in Europe, including the Palais des Beaux-Arts in Brussels and Museo de Arte Contemporáneo in Madrid. The exhibition was seen by more than half a million Americans.

"The purpose of OBJECTS: USA is to expose through a tour of exhibitions the objects being created today by artists in materials which have been traditionally called 'craft media,' such as clay, glass, fiber, wood. The timing of this survey could not be more appropriate, for during the past two years connoisseurs have been seriously reassessing the value labels normally assigned to the crafts. Placing paintings and sculpture into a convenient 'fine arts' category, and objects—whether functional or non-functional—into a craft category no longer sustains any aesthetic validity." – Lee Nordness

== Exhibitors ==
The show included over 500 pieces by 308 artists, who were unusually—and intentionally—diverse in terms of place, race, ethnicity and gender. They used traditional craft materials like ceramics, fiber, glass, metal, and wood, but in ways that reflected contemporary art movements like abstract expressionism, pop art, and funk art.

Among the artists chosen for the show were Anni Albers (textiles), Sheila Hicks (fiber), Paul Hultberg (enamel) Michele Oka Doner (multimedia), Dorian Zachai (weaving), Sister Mary Remy Revor (textiles), Lenore Tawney (textiles), Alma Eikerman (metal), Katherine Westphal (quilting) Alma Lesch (quilting), Merry Renk (metal), Gertrud and Otto Natzler (ceramics), Peter Voulkos (ceramics) Doyle Lane (ceramics), Harvey Littleton (glass), Richard Marquis (glass), Wharton Esherick (wood), Wendell Castle (wood), George Nakashima (wood), Dale Chihuly (glass) and Ron Nagle (ceramics).

The exhibition was featured on the relatively new medium of television, on NBC's Today Show. In addition, ABC aired a one-hour film With These Hands: The Rebirth of the American Craftsman featuring some of the artists.

== Catalog ==
The accompanying catalog, Objects: USA (1970) has been described as having "iconic, almost mythical status." It became "a bible of sorts", a "blue book", and a "key reference work" for curators and for organizations like Christie's auction house. "It became one of those reference points for almost any type of study of the studio craft field."

== Impact ==
External videos
- "OBJECTS: USA at 50" symposium, Smithsonian American Art Museum, July 19, 2019
- Watch the Objects: USA 2020 Book Launch, December 4, 2020

Objects: USA did not immediately achieve its stated goal of placing craft on an equal status with painting and sculpture. Craft brought with it uncomfortable associations with race, class, and gender. Visitors might flock to see the show, but New York art critics were not interested in admitting and overcoming entrenched biases about who could be an artist.

Nonetheless, Objects: USA is credited with presenting craft media as legitimate forms for artistic expression, reaching a wide audience both nationally and internationally, and changing perceptions of craft and its makers. The exhibition and the works of the artists in it continue to be referenced by curators, historians, collectors, artists and craftspeople.

"One of the most important exhibitions of the 20th century ... was Objects USA, in that it really showed an entirely new and contemporary look to craft that most people weren't aware of." – Lloyd E. Herman, 2010

"The ideas ... are still relevant today within the craft community. It's still looked at as this point ... that made craft accessible to the public in a new way. It still matters 50 years later." – Gloria Kenyon, Smithsonian American Art Museum

In recognition of Objects: USA's continuing importance, the Smithsonian American Art Museum held a symposium on July 19, 2019, to mark the 50th anniversary of the opening of the 1969 exhibition. 2020 marked the 50th anniversary of the 1970 publication of the gallery catalog for the original show.

The Racine Art Museum in Racine, Wisconsin, which holds a number of works from Objects: USA, created three presentations for their exhibition Objects Redux (2019–2020), thoughtfully demonstrating "how the act of making is such a powerful force for the human being". Houston Center for Contemporary Craft also hosted an exhibition in 2019.

== Triennial ==
New York based gallery R & Company opened a commemorative exhibition, Objects: USA 2020, which featured 50 artists from the original show along with 50 contemporary artists. The show's opening was delayed because of the COVID-19 pandemic, and happened in February 2021. The 2020-21 exhibition was curated by Glenn Adamson, James Zemaitis, Abby Bangser and Evan Snyderman, and was accompanied by the publication of the catalog Objects: USA 2020. The exhibition was on view at the gallery through September 2021.

On September 6, 2024, the gallery premiered the second iteration of the project and reconfigured it as a triennial to showcase contemporary art, craft, and design made in the United States. Objects: USA 2024 was curated by Angelik Vizcarrondo-Laboy and Kellie Riggs. This edition included 55 contemporary artists, and also accompanied a publication. Exhibited artists include Luam Melake, Misha Kahn, Kim Mupangilai, Joyce Lin, and Venancio Aragon.
