= Wendell Castle =

American artist (1932–2018)

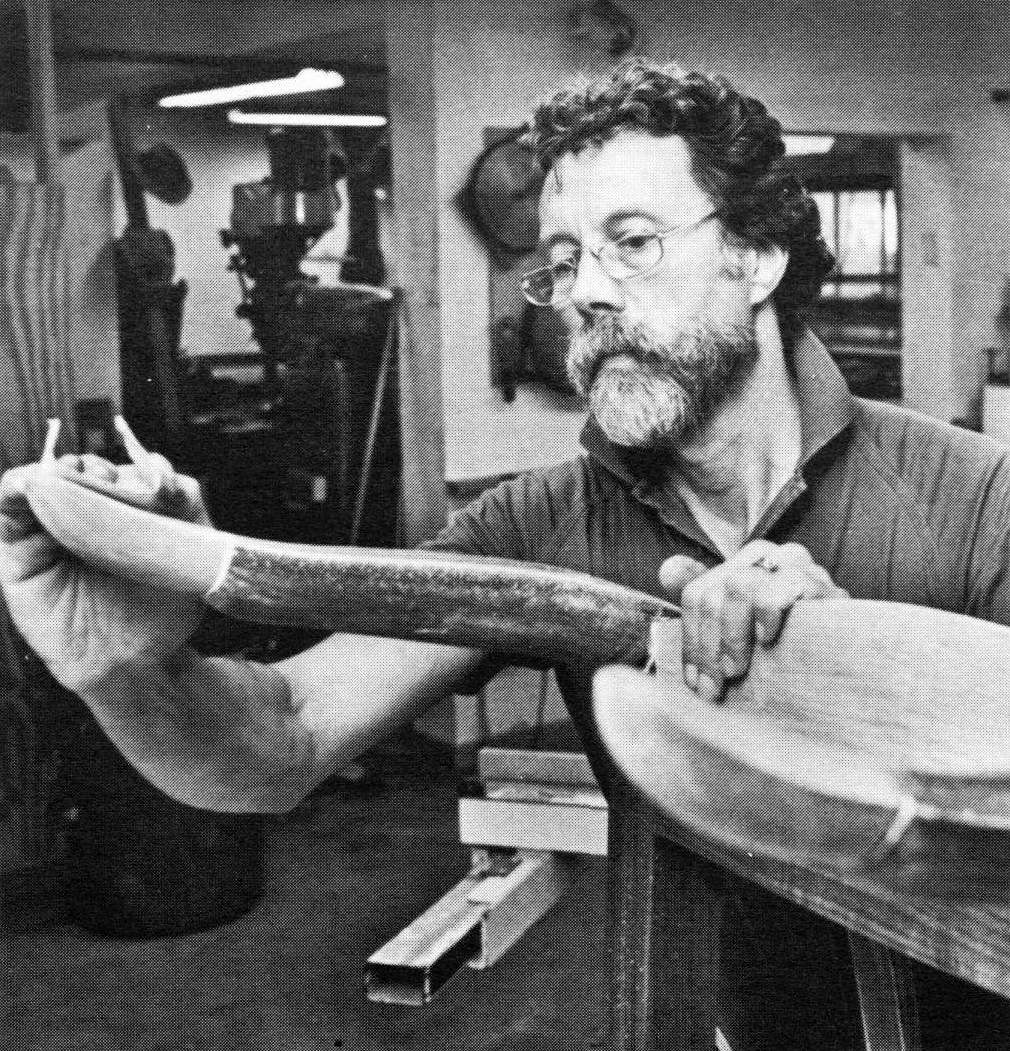
- Castle circa 1984
- Born: November 6, 1932; Emporia, Kansas
- Died: January 20, 2018 (aged 85); Scottsville, New York
- Known for: American craft, Art furniture
- Spouse: Nancy Jurs

Academic background
- Education: University of Kansas
- Website: www.wendellcastle.com

External videos
- GlassLab in Paris: Wendell Castle, Corning Museum of Glass

Wendell Castle (November 6, 1932 – January 20, 2018) was an American sculptor and furniture maker and an important figure in late 20th century American craft. He has been referred to as the "father of the art furniture movement" and included in the "Big 4" of modern woodworking with Wharton Esherick, George Nakashima, and Sam Maloof.

Castle introduced a woodworking technique called stack lamination to the creation of furniture. Originally used for making duck decoys, this technique allowed "infinite flexibility" and unprecedented control over shape and form. In addition to working in wood, he used plastics and metals.

During his life, Castle received many of awards including a 1994 'Visionaries of the American Craft Movement' award sponsored by the American Craft Museum, a 1997 Gold Medal from the American Craft Council, and a 2001 Award of Distinction from The Furniture Society.

== Education ==
Castle was born in Emporia, Kansas. He grew up and graduated from Holton High School in Holton, Kansas Class of 1951. In 1958, he received a Bachelor of Fine Arts in industrial design, and in 1961, he received a Master of Fine Arts in sculpture, both from the University of Kansas. He married fellow KU student and operatic mezzo-soprano Joyce Castle (prior to their marriage Joyce Malicky) in June 1961.

== Career ==
From 1962-1969, Castle taught at Rochester Institute of Technology, School for American Craftsmen, in Rochester, NY, and was an Artist in Residence. He bought a former soybean mill in Scottsville, New York in 1967 and converted it into a 15,000-square-foot studio. It stands near the former Baltimore & Ohio railroad station, the studio of Castle's wife, ceramicist and sculptor Nancy Jurs.

From 1969 to 1980 Castle taught on the faculty of The College at Brockport, State University of New York. In 1980, he opened the Wendell Castle School in Scottsville. The nonprofit school offered instruction in fine woodworking techniques and in furniture design. As of 1988 the Wendell Castle School became part of the Rochester Institute of Technology's furniture making program.

Castle is famous for his pioneering use of stack-lamination, a woodworking technique he introduced in the 1960s. It was based on a 19th-century sculptural technique used for making duck decoys. Stack-lamination allowed Castle to create large blocks of wood out a series of planks, which were then carved and molded into the biomorphic shapes for which he is best known. One example of this technique is his Chair Standing on its Head, which features a realistic-looking wooden pillow.

"Wendell Castle will always be known for his beautiful objects that defy definitions of sculpture or furniture, not easily categorized as art or design."– Saralyn Reece Hardy, Spencer Museum of Art

Castle died of leukemia in 2018. He was survived by his wife of fifty years, Nancy Jurs.

== Awards ==
- National Endowment for the Arts Grants
- 1988, Golden Plate Award, American Academy of Achievement
- 1994 'Visionaries of the American Craft Movement' award, American Craft Museum
- 1997, Gold Medal, American Craft Council
- 1998, Artist of the Year Award, Arts & Cultural Council for Greater Rochester.
- 2001, Award of Distinction, The Furniture Society

== Exhibitions ==
=== Museums ===
- Addison Gallery of American Art, Andover, MA
- Art Institute of Chicago, Chicago, IL
- Art Museum Project, Dearborn, MI
- High Museum, Atlanta, GA
- Mount Dora Modernism Museum, FL
- Brooklyn Museum, Brooklyn, NY
- Burchfield-Penney Art Center, Buffalo, NY
- Carnegie Museum of Art, Pittsburgh, PA
- Cincinnati Art Museum, Cincinnati, OH
- Charles A. Wustum Museum of Fine Arts, Racine, WI
- Design Museum Ghent, Ghent, Belgium
- Delaware Art Museum, Wilmington, DE
- Detroit Institute of Arts, Detroit, MI
- Everson Museum, Syracuse, NY
- High Museum of Art, Atlanta, GA
- Hunter Museum of Art, Chattanooga, TN
- Ithaca College Art Museum, Ithaca, NY
- Kirkland Museum of Fine & Decorative Art, Denver, CO
- KMAC Museum, Louisville, KY
- Lannan Foundation Collection, Los Angeles, CA
- Memorial Art Gallery, Rochester, NY
- Manchester Art Gallery, Manchester, UK
- Marianna Kistler Beach Museum of Art, Manhattan, KS
- Metropolitan Museum Of Art, New York, NY
- Milwaukee Art Museum, Milwaukee, WI
- Minneapolis Institute of Arts, Minneapolis, MN
- Mint Museum of Craft + Design, Charlotte, NC
- Mobile Museum of Fine Arts, Mobile, AL
- Museum of Art, St. Louis, MO
- The Museum of Arts and Design, New York, NY
- Museum of Decorative Arts, Montreal, Canada
- Museum of Fine Arts, Boston, MA
- Museum of Fine Arts, Houston, TX
- Museum of Modern Art, New York, NY
- The Nelson-Atkins Museum of Art, Kansas City, MO
- Nordenfieldske Kunstindustrimiseet, Oslo, Norway
- Philadelphia Museum of Art, Philadelphia, PA
- Racine Art Museum, Racine, WI
- Renwick Gallery, Smithsonian American Art Museum, Washington, DC
- Rochester Institute of Technology, Bevier Gallery, NY
- Smithsonian Institution, Washington, DC
- Spencer Museum of Art, Lawrence, KS
- Toledo Museum of Art, Toledo, OH
- University of New Hampshire Art Museum, Durham, NH
- University of Utah Art Gallery, Salt Lake City, UT
- Virginia Museum of Fine Arts, Richmond, VA
- Wichita Art Museum, Wichita, KS
- The White House, Washington, DC

=== Public/corporate installations ===
- American Express, New York, NY
- Bausch and Lomb, Rochester, NY
- Best Company, Richmond, VA
- Chatsworth House, England
- Dupont Center, Orlando, FL
- Encyclopædia Britannica Company, Chicago, IL
- Forbes Company, New York, NY
- Gilman Foundation, New York, NY
- Greater Rochester International Airport, NY
- Gannett Corporation, Washington, DC
- Hammerson Canada, Inc., Toronto, Canada
- Johnson Wax, Racine, WI
- Maccabees Mutual Life Insurance, Detroit, MI
- Nationsbank, Atlanta, GA
- Pillar Bryton Partners, FL
- Rosecliff Investments, New York, NY
- Steinway Company, Long Island City, NY
- Sydney Bestoff, New Orleans, LA
- Wolfsonian Foundation, FL

== Publications ==
- Patricia Bayer, editor. The Fine Art of the Furniture Maker, Conversations with Wendell Castle, Artist, and Penelope Hunter-Steibel, Curator, about Selected Works from the Metropolitan Museum of Art. Rochester, NY; Memorial Gallery of Art of the University of Rochester, 1981.
- Wendell Castle and David Edman, The Wendell Castle Book of Wood Lamination. VanNostrand Reinhold Publishers, 1980.
- Davira S. Taragin, Edward S. Cooke, Jr., and Joseph Giovannini. Furniture by Wendell Castle. Hudson Hills Press, 1989.

== Examples of work ==
A collection of Castle's works, all currently residing at The Art Institute of Chicago.
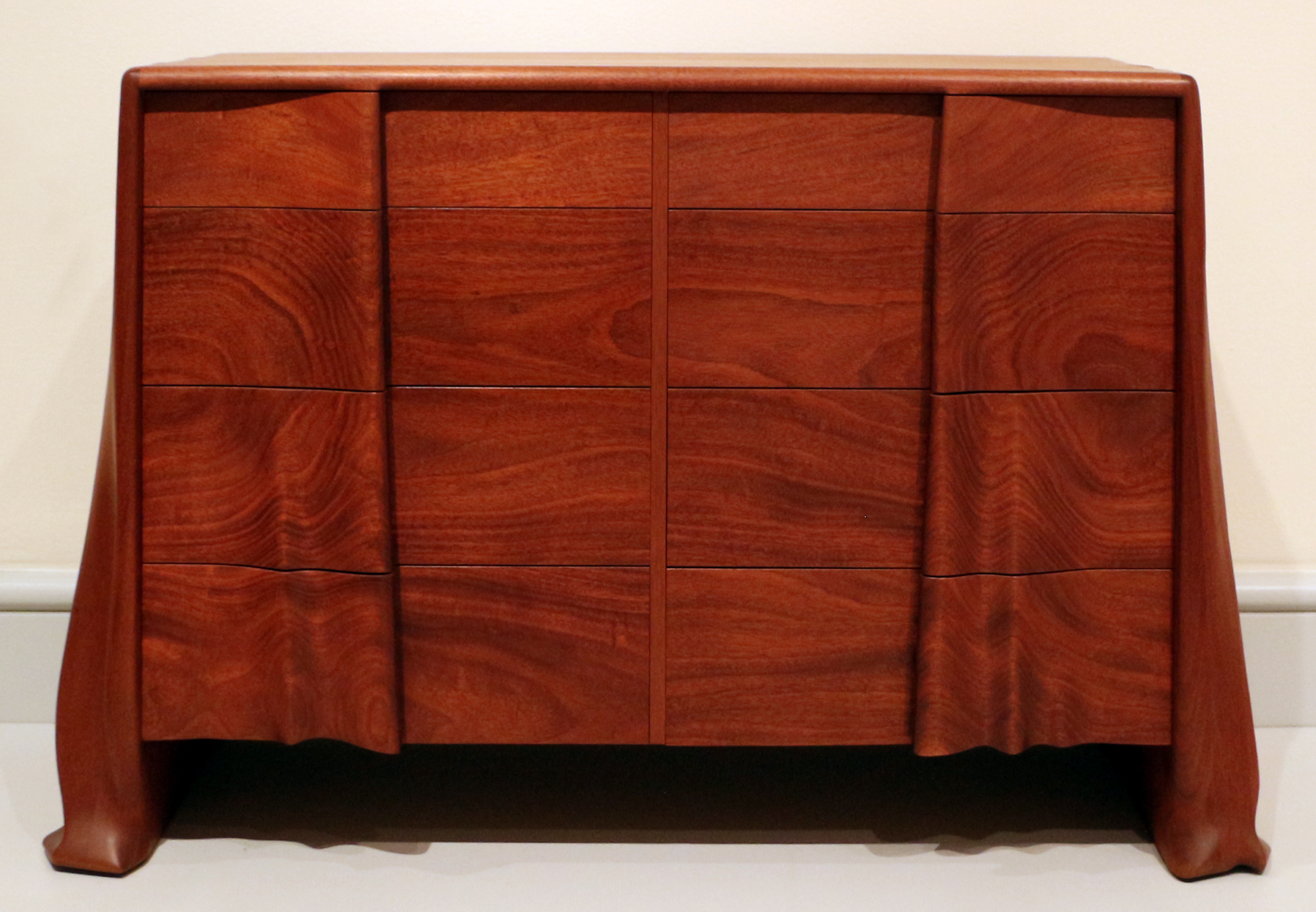
"Chest of drawers"

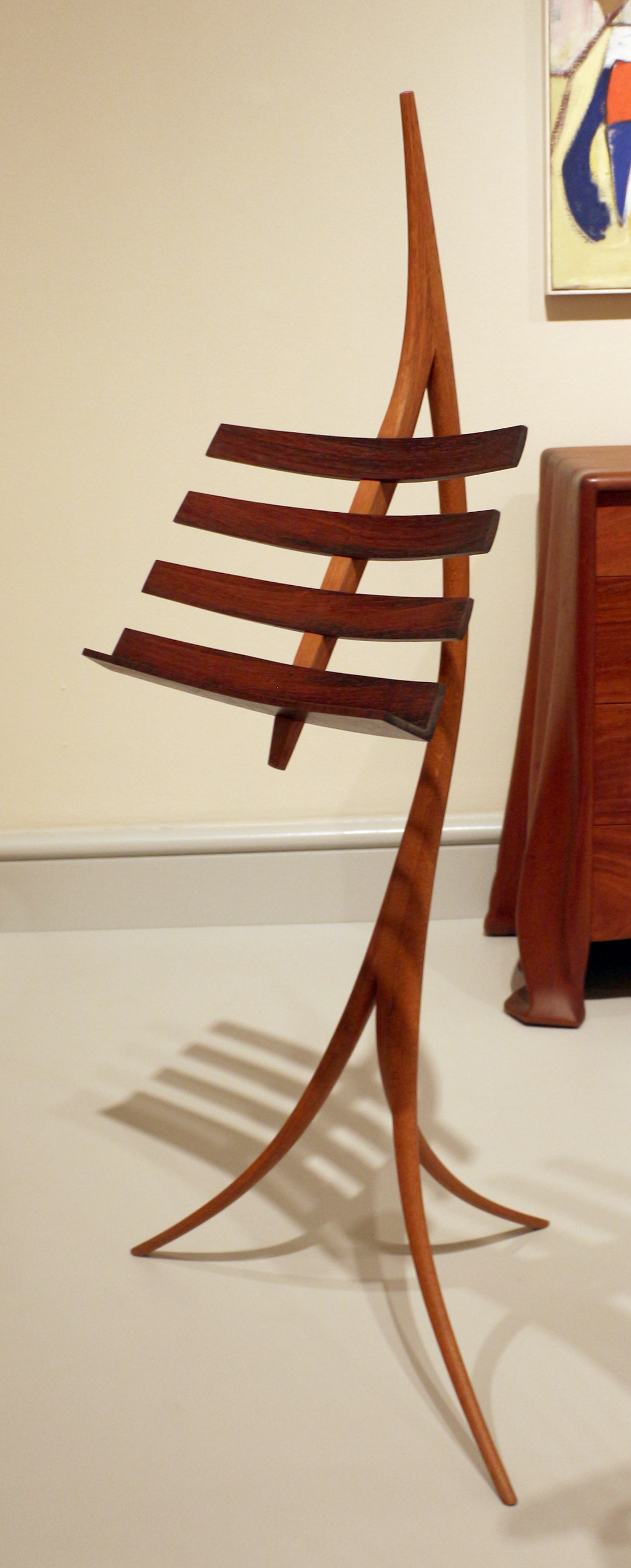
"Lectern"

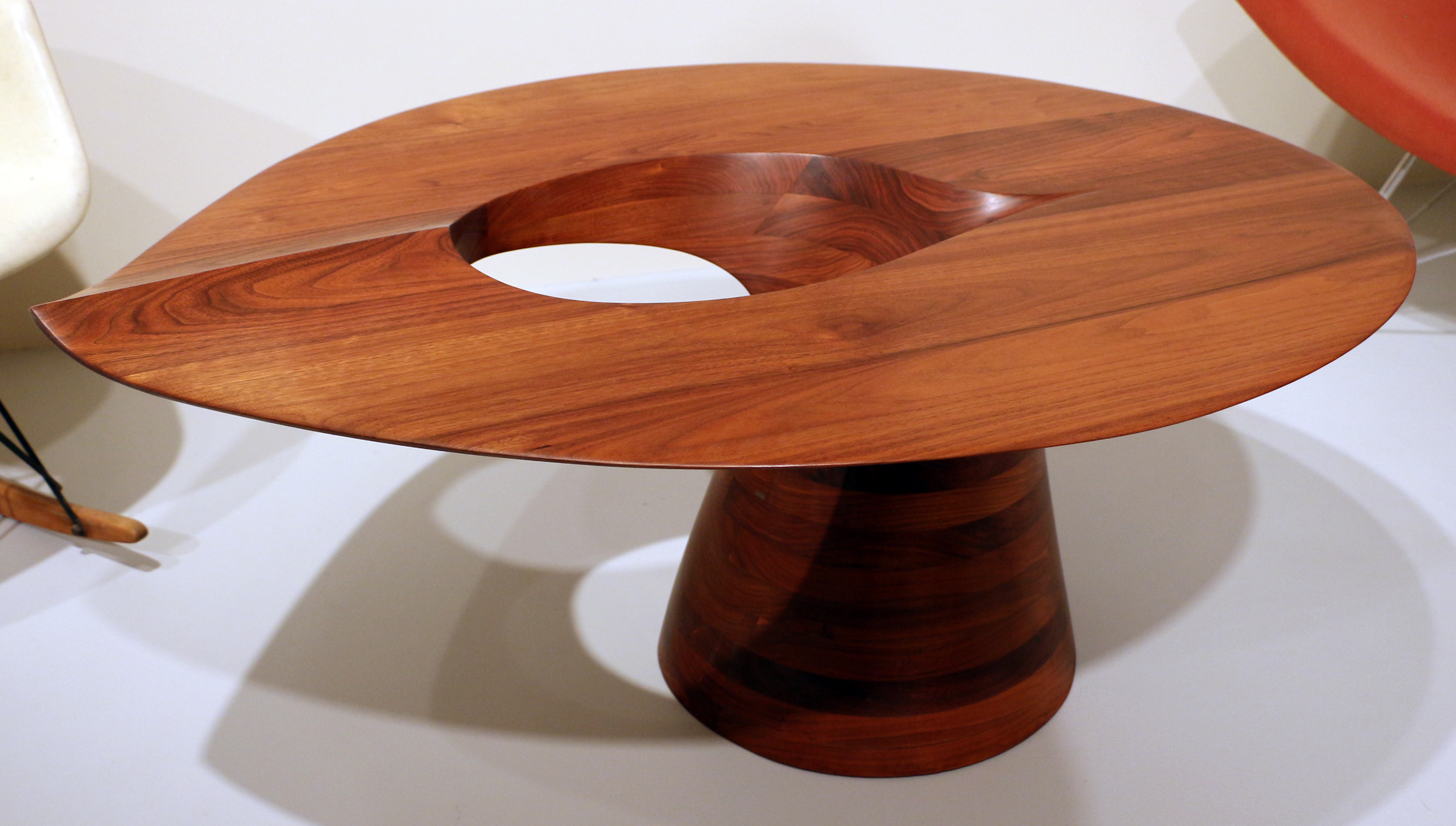
"Coffee Table"
