= Marilyn Pappas =

American artist

- Born: 1931; Brockton, Massachusetts
- Known for: Fiber artist
- Website: marilynpappas.com

Marilyn Pappas (born 1931, in Brockton, Massachusetts) is an American artist known for fiber art. She attended the Massachusetts College of Art and Design (MassArt) and Pennsylvania State University. She taught at MassArt from 1974 through 1994 retiring as professor emerita. Pappas' work is in the collections of the Krannert Art Museum, the Museum of Arts and Design, NYC, the Museum of Fine Arts, Houston, and the Museum of Fine Arts, Boston, Her work, Nike with Broken Wings, was acquired by the Smithsonian American Art Museum as part of the Renwick Gallery's 50th Anniversary Campaign. In 2022 the Fuller Craft Museum held a retrospective of her work.
