= Vera Williams =

American writer

Vera B. Williams
- Born: Vera Baker; January 28, 1927; Hollywood, California
- Died: October 16, 2015 (aged 88); Narrowsburg, New York, USA
- Education: High School of Music & Art Black Mountain College
- Occupations: Writer and illustrator
- Spouse: Paul Williams (−1970)
- Children: Sarah; Jennifer; Merce
- Writing career
- Period: 1975–2015
- Genres: Children's literature, picture books
- Notable works: As writer: It's a Gingerbread House (1978); A Chair for My Mother (1982)

Vera Baker Williams (January 28, 1927 – October 16, 2015) was an American children's writer and illustrator. Her best known work, A Chair for My Mother, has won multiple awards and was featured on the children's television show Reading Rainbow.

For her lifetime contribution as a children's illustrator she was U.S. nominee in 2004 for the biennial, international Hans Christian Andersen Award, the highest recognition available to creators of children's books. Additionally, she was awarded the 2009 NSK Neustadt Prize for Children's Literature.

== Biography ==
=== Early life and education ===
Vera Baker was born January 28, 1927, in Hollywood, California. She has one sister, Naomi. As a child, her family moved to the Bronx, New York, where her father was frequently absent during her early childhood. In New York City, she danced, acted, and painted at the Bronx House, a local community center. Her book Scooter, published in 1993, is based on her childhood in the Bronx.

Encouraged by their parents to explore the arts, she studied at the High School of Music & Art and Black Mountain College in North Carolina, where she received her BFA in Graphic Art in 1949.

=== Marriage and children ===
While at Black Mountain College, she married fellow student Paul Williams. The couple divorced in 1970. Together they had three children:

- Sarah Williams
- Jennifer Williams
- Merce Williams

She has five grandchildren:

- Hudson Williams
- August Williams
- William Babcock
- Rebecca Babcock
- Clare Babcock

=== Career ===
Williams was a co-founder of the Gate Hill Cooperative Community and served as a teacher for the community from 1953–70. She taught at alternative schools in New York and Ontario throughout the 1960s and early 1970s. Following her divorce, she emigrated to Canada, where she committed to becoming a children's author and illustrator.

In 1975 she was invited by Remy Charlip to illustrate Hooray for Me, which she did while living on a houseboat in Vancouver, British Columbia. She established a publishing relationship with Greenwillow Books that continues to this day.

Most recently, Ms. Williams resided in New York City and remained active in local issues such as The House of Elder Artists and participated in the 2007 PEN World Voices literary festival. She died on October 16, 2015.

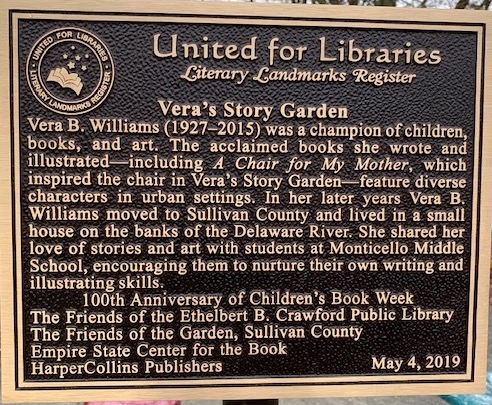
United for Libraries Literary Landmark dedicated by the Empire State Center for the Book

== Philosophical and political views ==
Williams long supported nonviolent and nuclear disarmament causes. She contributed artwork for several covers of Liberation magazine.

In 1981 she spent a month in Alderson Federal Prison Camp following arrest at a women's peaceful blockade of the Pentagon. She served on the executive committee of the War Resisters League from 1984 to 1987. Asked about her arrest record, she responded:

I don't make a point of ending up in jail, but if you try to put your hopes and beliefs for a better life into effect, arrest is sometimes a hazard. I am asked if I think any of his helps or works. I say, in the short run, we can't know, but many things we take for granted have been gained by the similar actions of people like myself: the end of child labor, more rights for black people, the vote for women, the end of the Vietnam War are a few. As a person who works for children, who raised three children...I have been able to say I did something to try to save our planet from destruction. It is my faith that we will.

== Legacy ==
On May 4, 2019, the Vera's Story Garden at Ethelbert B. Crawford Library in Monticello, New York, was named a United for Libraries Literary Landmark in honor of Vera B. Williams. It was dedicated by the Empire State Center for the Book.

Her original artwork is held in collections including the Library of Congress Prints and Photographs Division and the Black Mountain College Museum + Arts Center.

A book about Vera B. Williams by historian Mark Davenport is forthcoming as of January 2024.

== Works ==
=== As author ===
- It's a Gingerbread House (1978)
- The Great Watermelon Birthday (1980)
- Three Days on a River in a Red Canoe (1981)
- A Chair for My Mother (1982)
- Something Special for Me (1983)
- Music, Music for Everyone (1984)
- My Mother, Leah and George Sand (1986)
- Cherries and Cherry Pits (1986)
- Stringbean's Trip to the Shining Sea with Jennifer Williams (1988)
- "More More More" Said the Baby (1990)
- Scooter (1993)
- Lucky Song (1997)
- Amber Was Brave, Essie Was Smart (2001)
- A Chair for Always (2009)
- Home at Last with Chris Raschka (2016)

=== As illustrator ===
- Hooray For Me!, Remy Charlip (1975)
- Long Walks and Intimate Talks, Grace Paley (1991)
- Home: A Collaboration of Thirty Authors & Illustrators (1996)

== Awards ==
- 1983: Boston Globe–Horn Book Award, Picture Book category, A Chair for My Mother
- 1983: Caldecott Medal Honor Book, A Chair for My Mother
- 1985: Jane Addams Children's Book Award Honor Book, Music, Music for Everyone
- 1991: Caldecott Medal Honor Book, "More More More" Said the Baby
- 1994: Boston Globe–Horn Book Award, Fiction category, Scooter
- 1998: Charlotte Zolotow Award, Lucky Song
- 2002: Jane Addams Children's Book Award Honor Book, Amber Was Brave, Essie Was Smart
- 2008: Regina Medal of the Catholic Library Association; body of work
- 2009: NSK Neustadt Prize for Children's Literature

== Exhibitions ==
- 1995: Family, Friends, and Community: The Art of Vera B. Williams, Library of Congress
- 2024: Vera B. Williams / STORIES: Eight Decades of Politics and Picture Making, Black Mountain College Museum + Arts Center, Asheville, North Carolina, January 26 – May 11, 2024.
