= Studio craft =

Art practice

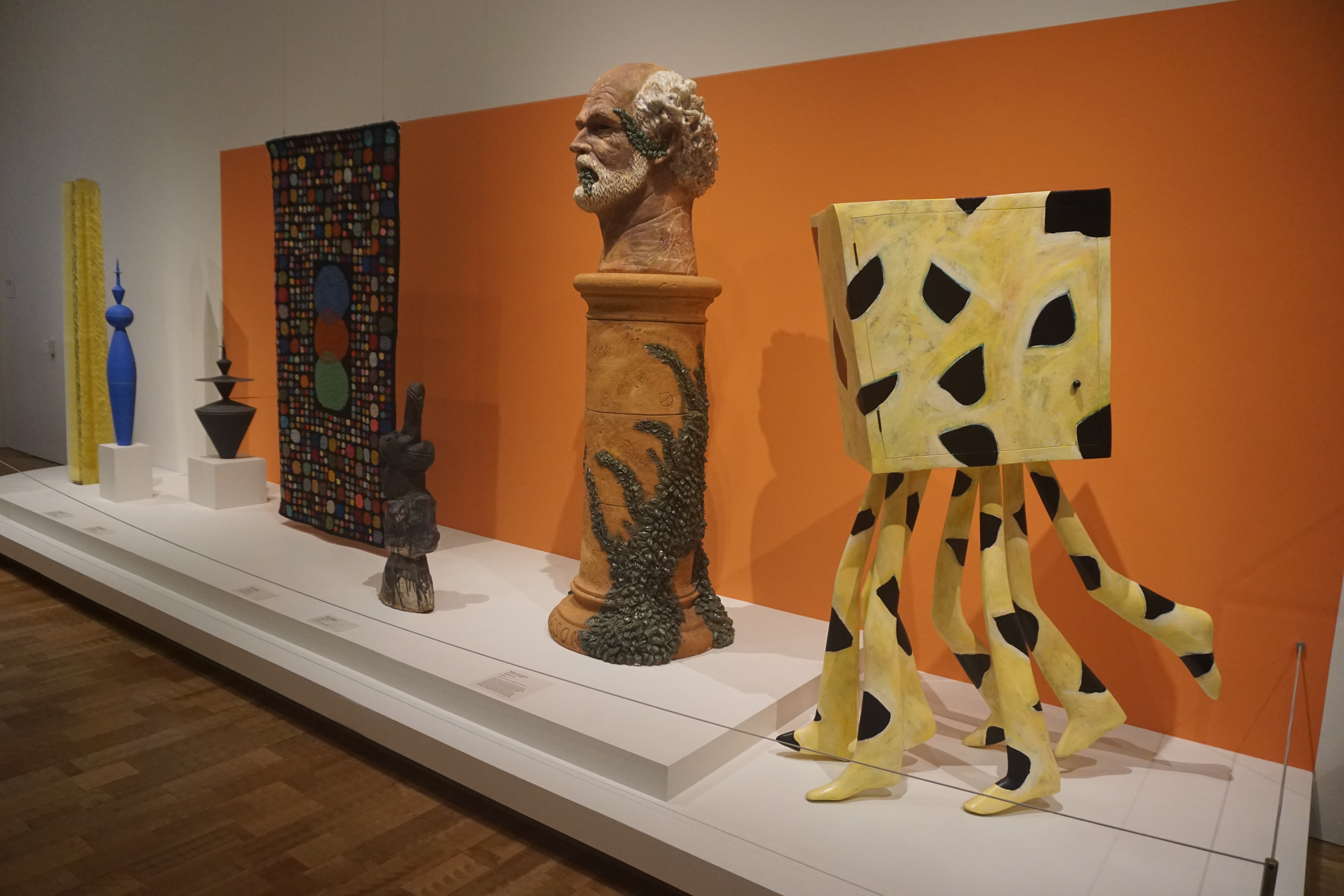
The Studio Craft Meets Design gallery at the Milwaukee Art Museum

Studio craft, or the studio craft movement, is the practice of craft methodology in an artist's or designer's studio. In contrast to traditional craft, which is done by craftsmen like cabinet makers or Ceramicists in a professional workshop, studio craft is when a designer or artist, who may have a more general understanding of any specific craft, produces objects themselves out of their own studio. Studio craft objects are often one of a kind, or produced in small quanitities. Studio craft object can be anything from a simple handmade bottle opener made by Michael Marriott to a highly sought-after chair made by Charles Rohlfs.

== Craft theory ==
Though studio craft works do seem to have some of the necessary conditions required for injection into critical art discourse, simplifying craft theory as synonymous with art theory strikes some crafts theorists as problematic. Glenn Adamson argues that the interesting thing about Craft is that it is perceived to be 'inferior' to art. In his book Thinking Through Craft Adamson presents an overview of this question in five chapters: supplemental, material, skilled, pastoral, and amateur Contrary to the implied second-class status of these themes, Adamson suggests that these are in fact the things that make craft significant and unique. Another craft theorist, Jenni Sorkin, uses Craft as a distinct portal into topics such as labor, gender, and community.

== History ==
The Arts and Crafts movement (1880–1920), had significant influence in the formulation of the studio crafts due in large part to the arts and crafts movement's emphasis on both the handmade object and the importance of the individual maker. This has been especially true in North America (see American craft) and the British Isles. Early furniture makers in this field include Gustav Stickley, Charles Rohlfs, Frank Lloyd Wright, and brothers Charles Sumner Green and Henry Mather Green (Greene and Greene).

The 1969 seminal exhibition OBJECTS:USA was a watershed moment aimed at bridging the century old divide between art and craft. To label themself as artist or craftsman was left to the individuals involved. The primary requirement was to have made the object in their studio themselves from start to finish, and essentially to their own taste and for their own spiritual satisfaction, as opposed to handing off their design to an industrial producer. The exhibition was intended as a comprehensive survey of what ultimately became known as the Studio Craft Movement. The book OBJECTS:USA grew out of the much celebrated exhibit that opened at the Smithsonian Institution, Washington, before touring the USA and Europe. Lee Nordness, the author of the book and curator of the exhibit, sought to highlight and at least contribute to resolving the primary dilemma as to where an object and its maker are to be placed within what he referred to as the, "arbitrary hierarchy between craft and fine art".

Perhaps an ideal example in the show of the challenges the makers faced regarding the ongoing argument between fine art and craft, would be the four foot by seven foot vitreous enamel mural on copper produced by artist Paul Hultberg that was featured in the exhibit. His work greatly magnified the scale and scope of a medium traditionally used in jewelry and other small-scale works commonly, and at times, disparagingly considered craft. Hultberg was recognized by the mid 60's as a major contributor to the vitality and growing intersection of art and craft.

Hultberg's abstract expressionist compositions were likened to that of his contemporaries, Jackson Pollack, Franz Kline and Clyfford Still, yet, Glenn Adamson questioned why Hultberg was not much better known today. Adamson's observations expressed in an article about Hultberg, highlighted the challenges of his medium of choice and prejudices he may have encountered:

"Given the evident seriousness and quality of his work, and the privileged position he had at the beating heart of the American avant-garde, it is difficult to understand his relative obscurity. The most obvious explanation is medium: for all his intelligent engagement with contemporaneous painting, his chosen discipline of enamel seems to occupy a space apart. Like many other artists associated with the postwar craft movement — ceramicists like Voulkas and Takaezu, weavers like Tawney, and the other great enamelist of his generation, June Schwarcz — he found himself categorized within a "minor art" genre."

Nordness and Hultberg shared an indifference to the "tiresome insoluble art-craft debate". This ongoing argument really only came about over the last hundred years, often centering around the maker's medium, as well as practical utility versus pure intellectual exploration. Hultberg's painterly aesthetic, clearly defined in his action paintings produced using vitreous enamel on copper, could just as easily be defined as fine art as any painting on canvas. As Adamson suggested, the medium was the most likely barrier.

OBJECTS:USA is widely recognized for its significant contributions to developing the Studio Craft Movement, and effectively presenting craft media as legitimate forms of artistic expression. Today's art world embraces new understandings of creativity, which may partially account for the more recent reevaluation of Hultberg's primary body of work and his unique contributions to 20th century art. The art market has evolved considerably since the 60's, with museums, galleries, auction houses and collectors taking objects more seriously that were once looked down upon as merely craft. For some, however, there remains to this day ingrained biases that continue to separate craft from fine art, those that were reflected most in language, gender and economic disparities.

== DIY craft ==
One of the more recent developments in studio craft seems to be the emergence of a solidified do-it-yourself (DIY) movement. Since the mid-century turn towards the conceptualization of the craft object significant academic and institutional structures have emerged to support studio craft. As of 2008 there are hundreds of masters and even doctoral programs dedicated solely to working in crafts media and theory, and as many museums and cultural institutions dedicated to contemporary craft. This trend however has not been without its opponents who claim that studio craft has undercut its origins by overinflating its product, making it entirely inaccessible to anyone who cannot afford the exorbitant prices studio craftspeople demand. These arguments have grown louder and there has been a significant trend towards listening to the voices of "DIYers," that is, makers whose training has not come from a necessarily institutional source and whose audience lies outside the narrow confines of "Studio Craft Institutions." DIY craft can be found in many places among them the internet hub Etsy and in many craft fairs and venues around the country. The work of "DIYers" is often pejoratively referred to as "Crafty Craft" or "Craft with a K."

== See also ==
- American craft
