= David Weinrib =

American sculptor

David Weinrib (1924–2016) was an American artist most renowned for sculpture and ceramic art.

== Biography ==
In 1952, with his wife Karen Karnes, Weinrib was a resident potter during the first Crafts Institute at Black Mountain College. The October 15–29, 1952, workshop also included instruction by Bernard Leach, Shoji Hamada, Dr. Soetsu Yanagi and Marguerite Wildenhain. At this time, Weinrib began experimenting in his practice of art production, creating tiles, "slab" pottery, and sculpted pots.

In the summer of 1953, Weinrib and Karnes led the school's second Craft Institute along with Warren MacKenzie, Daniel Rhodes, Peter Voulkos. In fall 1954, Weinrib and Karnes would leave Black Mountain College and relocate to Stony Point, New York to begin working with M. C. Richards, David Tudor, and John Cage at Gate Hill Cooperative.

Weinrib is known for working with diverse media. In the 1960s, Weinrib became prominent creating abstract sculptures to be mounted or hung during exhibition in a series of shows at the Howard Wise Gallery. In 1965, Weinrib participated in the critically acclaimed Concrete Expressionism show curated by critic Irving Sandler at New York University, which also featured the work of sculptors Ronald Bladen and George Sugarman and painters Al Held and Knox Martin. In the 1970s, Weinrib created cast resin sculptural art.

David Weinrib was an adjunct professor at Pratt Institute for thirty years. While teaching there, he founded and then curated the school's sculpture garden, The Pratt Sculpture Park. In 2006, Public Art Review named the garden, "one of the ten best college and university campus art collections in the country."

During his career, Weinrib was honored with Guggenheim, NEA, and Fulbright grants.
