= M. C. Richards =

American poet, potter, writer

- Born: Mary Caroline Richards; July 13, 1916; Weiser, Idaho, U.S.
- Died: September 10, 1999 (aged 83); Kimberton, Pennsylvania, U.S.
- Education: Oregon Episcopal School
- Alma mater: Reed College, University of California, Berkeley,
- Occupations: poet, potter, writer, essayist, translator, educator
- Spouse(s): Vernon Young (divorced), Albert William Levi Jr. (divorced)

Mary Caroline Richards (July 13, 1916, Weiser, Idaho – September 10, 1999, Kimberton, Pennsylvania) was an American poet, potter, and writer best known for her book Centering: in Pottery, Poetry and the Person. Educated at Reed College, in Portland, Oregon, and at the University of California at Berkeley, she taught English at the Central Washington College of Education and the University of Chicago, but in 1945 became a faculty member of the experimental Black Mountain College in North Carolina where she continued to teach until the end of the summer session in 1951.

Her teaching experience and growth as an artist while at Black Mountain College prepared the foundation for most of her work in life, both as an educator and creator. Later in life, she discovered the work of Rudolf Steiner and lived the last part of her life at a Camphill Village in Kimberton, Pa. In 1985, while living at the Kimberton Camphill Village she began teaching workshops with Matthew Fox at the University of Creation Spirituality in Oakland, Ca. during the winter months. Mary Caroline Richards died in 1999 in Kimberton.

== Early life and education ==
M.C. Richards was born in Weiser, Idaho on July 13, 1916. As an infant her family moved to Portland, Oregon where she spent the early part of her life. In 1935 she attended high school at the Oregon Episcopal School (then called St. Helen's Hall Junior College).

She earned a Bachelor of Arts degree at Reed College in Portland, in Literature and Languages. She earned a MA degree in 1939 in English and a PhD in 1942 in English and linguistics, both degrees were from University of California, Berkeley.

In 1943 she taught English at the Central Washington College of Education in Ellensburg, Washington and married Vernon Young (marriage later dissolved). From there she taught briefly at the University of California at Berkeley and at the University of Chicago, but became disillusioned with the traditional academic environment. While teaching at the University of Chicago, she met the social scientist Albert William Levi Jr., and they were married in 1945 (their marriage was dissolved while she was teaching at Black Mountain College).

== Black Mountain College years (1945–1952) ==
In 1945 Richards joined the faculty of the English Department at Black Mountain College, where she taught writing and literature, and where she served as Faculty Chair from 1949 to 1951.

At Black Mountain College, M.C. Richards was one of the most popular teachers with the students. She grouped her courses under the general heading of "Reading and Writing" while including important elements such as literary criticism, creative writing, and dramatic literature. It was here that she began to make the transition from the academic career for which she had been trained and moved into taking a more creative approach in her teaching methods.

Here began many of the associations which connect her to the music and art worlds, through friendships with David Tudor, Lou Harrison and John Cage in music, Merce Cunningham and Remy Charlip in dance, Charles Olson, Robert Creeley, and Robert Duncan (loosely known as the "Black Mountain Poets") in literature, and Lyle Bongé and Joe Fiore in the visual arts. Her involvement with theater began at Black Mountain College with her translation of plays by Jean Cocteau and Erik Satie.

In 1948 Richards and her students founded the Black Mountain Press. The purpose was to give students experience in typesetting and publishing. In addition they published literary works, broadsides, and booklets. The Black Mountain Press published M.C.'s first book of collected poems, titled Poems as well as the short-lived Black Mountain College Review, not to be confused with the later Black Mountain Review edited by Robert Creeley.

Though intended as a series, only one issue (Vol. 1, No. 1, June 1951) of The Black Mountain College Review was printed, featuring a Noh play by Nick Cernovich, "High Speed Computing Machines" by Natasha Goldowski, poems by Fielding Dawson and Joel Oppenheimer, linoleum cuts by H. Roco, and other contributions by Mary Fitton Fiore, Russell Edson, and Alex Kemeny. The editorial work was shared between M.C. Richards, Alex Kemeny, and Hazel Larsen. A second issue was set in type but never printed due to lack of funds.

While at Black Mountain College, Richards befriended student James Leo Herlihy, who went on to be a noted novelist, playwright and actor.

When she resigned her faculty position at Black Mountain College after the summer of 1951, she moved to New York City along with pianist and Cage associate David Tudor. There they joined John Cage and Merce Cunningham, where they collaborated with others to include Ray Johnson, Robert Rauschenberg, Susan Weil, Paul Taylor, and Viola Farber.

While in New York, she began to study pottery at the Greenwich House in Greenwich Village. She also began to work on the first English translation of Anton Artaud's The Theatre and Its Double, which was published by Grove Press in 1958 to wide acclaim. Richards's translation is considered the definitive English version of the essays and was instrumental in introducing Artaud's work in the United States.

In summer 1952, she participated in Theater Piece No. 1 at Black Mountain College, an event that came to be known as the first Happening. It was organized by John Cage and also involving Robert Rauschenberg, Charles Olson, David Tudor, and Merce Cunningham.

In the catalog for her exhibition at the Tampa Museum of Art in 1991 with John Cage, Merce Cunningham, and Irwin Kremen, M.C. wrote about her experience at Black Mountain College as "challenging the intellectual imagination and being a time for a very alive and vibrant artistic community." During her time there she was able to "think of her work as integrating the soul, the mind, and the muscle." She was able to participate as a writer in the writing classes that she taught, and developed a print shop there where she and her students could print their work.

== Endless Mountains Farm, pottery, poetry (1953–1984) ==
In 1953 she returned to Black Mountain College as a student to study pottery with Karen Karnes and David Weinrib. During a Summer Institute at Black Mountain College, Daniel Rhodes, Warren MacKenzie, and Peter Voulkos were invited to teach pottery for three weeks each. This sparked a shift for M.C. Richards as a "poet potter" working in clay.

In 1954 Richards, Tudor, and Cage, among other former Black Mountain faculty, became part of the Gate Hill Cooperative community, also known as The Land, in Stony Point, Rockland County, New York, founded by the architect Paul Williams. In Stony Point, she shared a pottery studio with Karen Karnes and David Weinrib. She remained in the Stony Point community for ten years and it was here that she wrote Centering: In Pottery, Poetry, and the Person.

In 1964, the same year she left Stony Point, her book Centering: In Pottery, Poetry and the Person was published by Wesleyan University Press, followed in 1973 by The Crossing Point: Nine Easter Letters on the Art of Education and in 1980 by Toward Wholeness: Rudolf Steiner Education in America. These books reveal a very personal view of the development of the individual through art and life and, combined with her extensive teaching and lecturing throughout the 1960s, 1970s, and 1980s, were widely influential in the arts education and craft communities.

In 1965, Richards lifelong friend, potter Paulus Berensohn purchased 100 acres of land outside of Scranton, Pennsylvania for the creation of the Endless Mountains Farm art colony. M.C. Richards joined Paulus at the Farm a few years later in 1968. Due to a health scare, Berensohn left Endless Mountains Farm in 1972 however it remained in community operation. The farm had changed ownership shares over the years, the last owner was M.C. Richards in 1993, and she decided to put her future energy into Camphill Village in Kimberton, Pennsylvania and sold her shares.

Mary Beth Edelson's Some Living American Women Artists / Last Supper (1972) appropriated Leonardo da Vinci’s The Last Supper, with the heads of notable women artists collaged over the heads of Christ and his apostles; M.C. was among those notable women artists. This image, addressing the role of religious and art historical iconography in the subordination of women, became "one of the most iconic images of the feminist art movement."

== University of Creation Spirituality with Matthew Fox (1985–1999) ==
Later in life she taught art at the Institute in Culture and Creation Spirituality (ICCS) at Holy Names College (now Holy Names University) in Oakland, California. ICCS was founded by former Roman Catholic and current Episcopal priest Matthew Fox (priest). Matthew invited M.C. Richards to be on his faculty at the University of Creation Spirituality teaching a course on "Art as Meditation." She continued to teach there during the winter and live at the Camphill Village Intentional Community in Kimberton Hills, Pennsylvania during the rest of year, while also continuing to teach workshops at various literary and visual art centers.

== Camphill Village (1984–1999) ==
She spent the last 15 years of her life living and working as a volunteer at Camphill Village Kimberton Hills, in Pennsylvania, an intentional living community based on the teachings of Rudolf Steiner, where the documentary film M.C. Richards: The Fire Within (2003) was made. There she also worked with residents with developmental disabilities.

== Selected works ==
- Poems, Black Mountain Press, 1947-1948
- Centering: in Pottery, Poetry, and the Person, Wesleyan University Press, 1964
- The Crossing Point: Selected Talks and Writings, Wesleyan University Press, 1973
- Toward Wholeness: Rudolf Steiner Education in America, Wesleyan University Press, 1980
- The Public School and The Education of The Whole Person, Pilgrim Press, 1980
- Imagine Inventing Yellow: New and Selected Poems, Station Hill Press, 1991
- Opening Our Moral Eye: Essays, Poems, Paintings, Embracing Creativity and Community, Lindisfarne Press, 1996
- Backpacking in the Hereafter: Poems by M.C. Richards, Black Mountain College Museum + Arts Center, 2014

== Selected exhibitions ==
- Question Everything! The Women of Black Mountain College, Black Mountain College Museum + Arts Center, Asheville, NC, 2020.
- M.C. Richards, Centering: Life + Art — 100 Years, Black Mountain College Museum + Arts Center, Asheville, NC, 2016.
- The Shape of Imagination: Women of Black Mountain College, Black Mountain College Museum + Arts Center, Asheville, NC, 2009.
- Imagine Inventing Yellow: The Life and Works of M.C. Richards, Worcester Center for Crafts, 1999.
- The Black Mountain Connection: John Cage, Merce Cunningham, Irwin Kremen, M.C. Richards, The Tampa Museum of Art, 1992.
- ‘’An Evening with M.C. Richards and Friends’’, Fort Mason’s Cowell Theatre Pier 2 San Francisco, CA, September 15, 1989.
