= Natasha Goldowski Renner =

20th century physicist

- Natasha Goldowski at Black Mountain College
- Born: Nathalie Michel Goldowski; 1908; Moscow, Russian Empire
- Died: October 1966 (aged 57–58); Guadalajara, Mexico
- Education: University of Paris
- Known for: Metallurgist and corrosion expert for the Manhattan Project.
- Spouse: Eric Renner
- Scientific career
- Fields: Physics, physical chemistry
- Institutions: Princeton University; Black Mountain College; Alfred University

Natasha Goldowski Renner (born Nathalie Michel Goldowski; 1908 – October 1966) was a Russian-born American physicist and educator. She worked on the Manhattan Project, and later taught at Princeton University, Black Mountain College and Alfred University.

== Biography ==
=== Early life and education ===
Natasha Goldowski was born into an aristocratic Russian family in Moscow in 1908. Together with her mother, Anna Goldowski, she immigrated to Paris in 1917 to flee the Russian Revolution.

She was educated in France, earning a Dr.Sc. and Ph.D. from the University of Paris in 1935 and 1939. At age thirty-two she became Chief of Metallurgical Development for the French Air Ministry. Her work in this role included protecting the aluminum frames of French seaplanes from salt water corrosion by introducing strips of magnesium.

When the Nazi occupation of France began, she and her mother immigrated again, this time to the US.

=== Manhattan Project ===
Goldowski first found work in the US as a researcher for the Sciaky Brothers in Chicago, but soon after became a metallurgist and corrosion expert for the Manhattan Project. She joined the University of Chicago's Metallurgical Laboratory ("Met Lab") in 1943, where she engineered a non-corroding aluminum coating that could be used in jackets surrounding the uranium fuel in Hanford plutonium production reactors. This coating was critical to the success of plutonium production.

Goldowski created a moving picture about the corrosion of metals, for which she received a medal. She also lectured about her work at the Nobel Institute and the Belgian Royal Academy.

At Met Lab, she earned a reputation for her Parisian fashion sense and for her flamboyant personality: one frequently repeated story relates that she "once plowed into Enrico Fermi while zipping through a Met Lab building’s halls on roller skates."

Under McCarthyism, Goldowski lost her security clearance, in part because she did not become naturalized as a US citizen until 1947. Her career shifted into education.

=== Teaching ===
Goldowski's first work in education was at Princeton University, where she taught in the physics and math departments.

From fall 1947-summer 1953 (with the exception of a leave of absence from summer 1951 to summer 1952) she taught chemistry and physics at Black Mountain College, an experimental educational community located in Western North Carolina that emphasized the arts in its curriculum. Goldowski's colleagues at Black Mountain College included fellow European emigrants Max Dehn, Josef and Anni Albers, Ilya Bolotowsky, Trude Guermonprez, Fritz Hansgirg, Paul Leser, Charlotte Schlesinger, and Stefan Wolpe. She also taught alongside John Cage, Hazel Larsen Archer, and M.C. Richards. Natasha Goldowski's mother, Madame Anna Goldowski, also served as faculty, teaching French and Russian. Natasha eventually married a Black Mountain College student, Eric Renner.

In 1948, Goldowski led a non-credit seminar on cybernetics using galley proofs from Norbert Wiener’s book Cybernetics. The seminar particularly influenced the poet Charles Olson (who failed to establish a convivial relationship with Goldowski following his installation as rector of the college, precipitating her departure) as well as Robert Duncan, Robert Creeley and other Black Mountain poets. Goldowski's essay "High Speed Computing Machines" was included in the first and only edition of the Black Mountain College Review edited by M.C. Richards, Alex Kemeny, and Hazel Larsen Archer, published in June 1951 (predating the later Black Mountain Review edited by Robert Creeley from 1954-1957).

After leaving Black Mountain College, Natasha Goldowski Renner worked in industry until 1956. In 1955, she was among a group of former faculty including Nell Rice and Hazel Larsen Archer who brought a lawsuit against the college for payment of back salaries.

From 1956-1962, she taught at Alfred University in New York as an associate professor of physics. The Natasha Goldowski Renner Prize in Physics named for her and is awarded to students displaying excellence and promise in the field of physics.

=== Later life ===
Natasha Goldowski Renner later emigrated to Mexico with her husband, where the two worked as scientific translators.

She died of meningitis in Guadalajara in October 1966.

== Published works ==
- Protection of Alumag in Bimetallic Constructions [by Metallization]. Métaux, 1935.
- Contribution à l'étude de la corrosion. E. Blondel La Rougery, 1935. With Charles Grard.
- Contribution à l'étude des potentiels de dissolution. E. Blondel La Rougery, 1939.
- "Korrosion." Zeitschrift für analytische Chemie 116.5-6 (1939): 216-221.With W. Palmaer, E. Heyn, O. Bauer, H. E. Searle, F. L. La Que, W. R. van Wijk, H. J. Lodeesen, H. Fournier, H. Thyssen, J. Bourdouxhe, E. Naumann, U. R. Evans & W. Blum. https://doi.org/10.1007/BF01358941.
