= Black Mountain College Museum + Arts Center =

Art museum in Asheville, North Carolina, US

- Asheville, NC Asheville, NC (the United States)
- Established: 1993
- Location: 120 College Street, Asheville, North Carolina
- Coordinates: 35.597301°N 82.55216°W
- Type: Art museum
- Founder: Mary Holden Thompson
- Executive director: Jeff Arnal
- Parking: Street parking
- Website: blackmountaincollege.org

The Black Mountain College Museum + Arts Center (BMCM+AC) is an exhibition and performance space and resource center located at 120 College Street on Pack Square Park in downtown Asheville, North Carolina dedicated to preserving and continuing the legacy of educational and artistic innovations of Black Mountain College (BMC). BMCM+AC achieves its mission through collection, conservation, and educational activities including exhibitions, publications and public programs.

== History ==
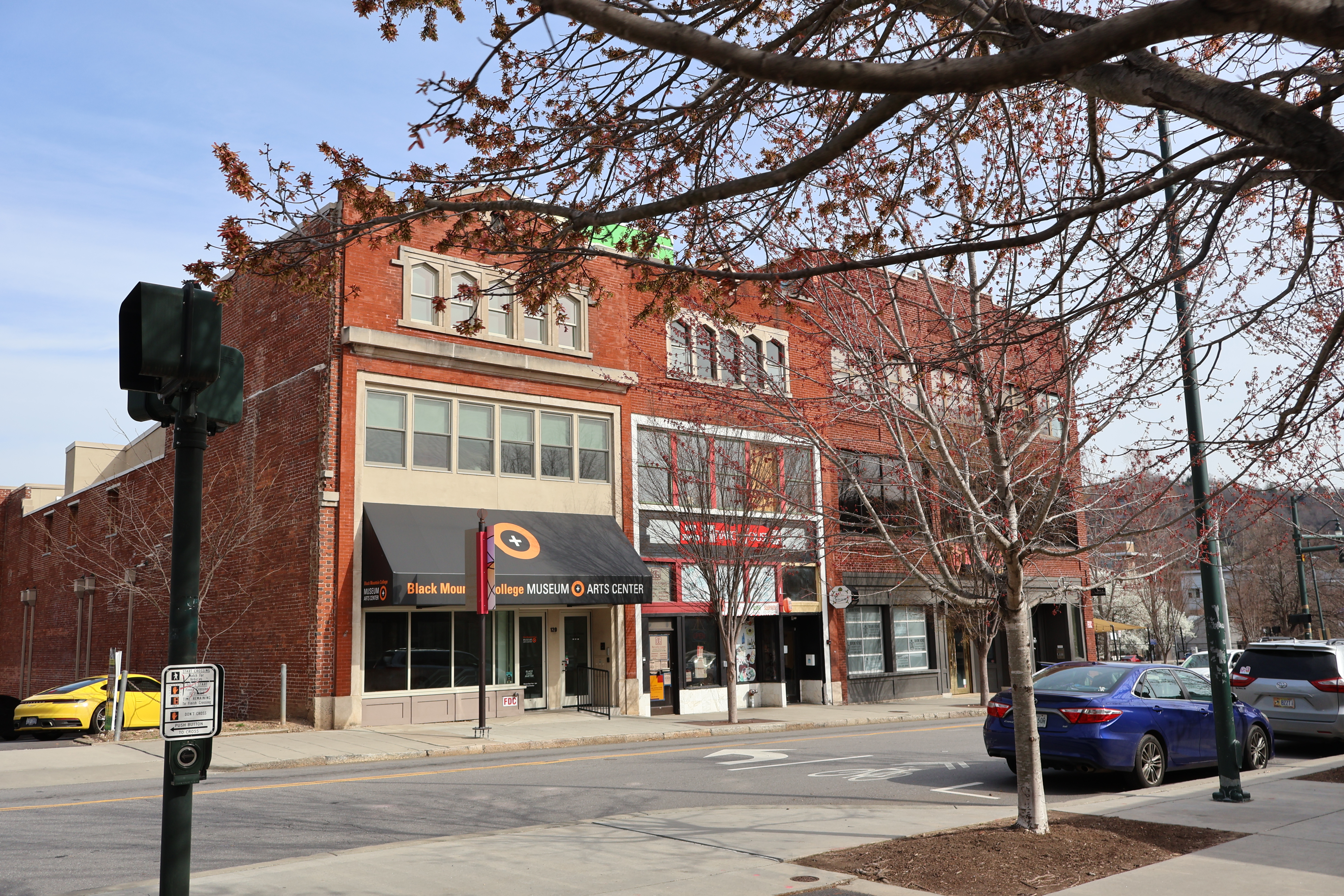
The Black Mountain College Museum + Arts Center in Asheville, North Carolina

Arts advocate Mary Holden Thompson founded BMCM+AC in 1993 to celebrate the history of Black Mountain College as a forerunner in progressive interdisciplinary education and to explore its extraordinary impact on modern and contemporary art, dance, theater, music, and performance. Today, the museum remains committed to educating the public about BMC's history and raising awareness of its extensive legacy. BMCM+AC's goal is to provide a gathering point for people from a variety of backgrounds to interact through art, ideas, and discourse.

BMCM+AC was first based out of founder Mary Holden Thompson's house in Black Mountain, NC. Exhibitions and collecting were accomplished through community partnerships. The museum hired its first regular employee, Alice Sebrell, as part time office manager, in 1999. In 2003 BMCM+AC gained a physical presence in a storefront gallery at 56 Broadway. In August 2016 Jeff Arnal was hired as executive director.

In September 2018, BMCM+AC opened a new space at 120 College Street, a relocation and expansion to a newly renovated building on Pack Square Park in the heart of Asheville. The new 6,000 square foot space doubled the museum's footprint and includes 2,500 square feet of flexible exhibition/event space with a seating capacity for 180, a permanent Black Mountain College history and research center, an expanded library and education center with over 1,500 BMC-related texts, and on-site storage for the museum's permanent collection and research center.

=== Timeline ===
- 1993 – Founding of the Black Mountain College Museum + Arts Center.
- 1995 – A Black Mountain College reunion is organized and attended by over 100 alumni.
- 1997 – BMCM+AC launches an ongoing oral history program dedicated to documenting Black Mountain College alumni.
- 2002 – A regional festival called Under the Influence takes place, exploring the legacy of Black Mountain College through music, education and performance.
- 2003 – BMCM+AC opens a museum gallery space in downtown Asheville at 56 Broadway Street.
- 2009 – The first annual international ReVIEWING Black Mountain College conference is held, organized in partnership with the University of North Carolina at Asheville (UNCA).
- 2010 – The first annual {Re}HAPPENING is held, an experimental art event featuring over 100 artists held on the former grounds of Black Mountain College at Lake Eden.
- 2010 – A partnership is established with UNCA to provide digitization and archival storage for the growing BMCM+AC archives.
- 2011 – An NEH Landmarks of American History and Culture grant is awarded.
- 2011 – A new online publication, the Journal of Black Mountain College Studies, is created.
- 2012 – The state of North Carolina moves Black Mountain College records to the Western Regional Archives in Oteen, NC, which further establishes Asheville as a center for BMC studies and strengthens BMCM+AC's partnership with the Archives.
- 2016 – The museum opens a second location at 69 Broadway, a newly redesigned and renovated research and gallery space.
- 2017 – BMCM+AC Performance Initiative and Active Archive programs begin.
- 2018 – BMCM+AC relocates to a new, permanent home at 120 College Street, consolidating its 69 Broadway (2003-2018) and 56 Broadway (2016-2017) locations. The inaugural exhibition in the new space is Between Form and Content: Perspectives on Jacob Lawrence and Black Mountain College, supported by an NEA Art Works grant.
- 2020 – BMCM+AC is closed for six months, from March 15 - September 16, as a result of the COVID-19 pandemic, and presents online events & resources for visitors to virtually engage with the museum.
- 2022 – With support from an NEH Humanities Collections & Reference Resources grant, BMCM+AC launches its first digital collections portal, collections.blackmountaincollege.org.
- 2023 – The 30th anniversary of BMCM+AC's founding.

== Exhibitions ==
Pieces from the permanent collection, as well as loaned works, are featured via a rotating schedule of temporary exhibitions, which are on display for an average of four months at time. Exhibitions display the many histories of Black Mountain College through shared themes or the work of singular alumni. Exhibitions are often connected to contemporary legacies of BMC through programming or complimentary installations.

The show BREAKING NEW GROUND: The Studio Potter + Black Mountain College opened in 2007. Curated by Bobby Gold, it featured functional works by potters who were at Black Mountain College in the 1950s, including many who attended the Pottery seminar at Black Mountain College in 1952.

BMCM+AC has also co-curated exhibitions with a variety of regional institutions, including the Hickory Museum of Art, Western Carolina University, Folk Art Center, the Western Regional Archives, and the Smith-McDowell House.

== Collections ==
=== BMCM+AC Permanent Collection ===
The BMCM+AC permanent collection includes items with dates of creation ranging from 1931 to 2004. All items in the collection have a direct connection to the history of BMC, such as original college publications and other primary source materials. Components of the collection are photographs, ephemera, paintings, drawings/prints, poems/books/monographs/magazines/articles, writings/correspondences. The museum owns a variety of objects, including ceramics/clay, furniture/wood, sculptures, weavings/fiber, collages and mixed media pieces, broadsides/artists’ books and music/album covers.

In addition, the collection features a full set of the poetry journal The Black Mountain Review, which formed the group of writers known as the Black Mountain Poets. In Summer 2013, the museum acquired a 1971 work by BMC alumnus Robert Rauschenberg, Opal Gospel, 10 American Indian Poems, consisting of 10 moveable silkscreened acrylic panels of American Indian stories and imagery. Other noted pieces in the collection are furniture from the original Black Mountain College campuses: two benches from the Quiet House, a place for contemplation, meditation, and observance of special occasions at the Lake Eden campus and a desk designed by Josef Albers. BMCM+AC has an original Black Mountain College directional sign from the Lake Eden Campus, which is displayed in the museum library. The collection features many other works by various alumni, faculty and key figures of Black Mountain College including, among many others, Ruth Asawa, Ray Johnson, Kenneth Noland, Charles Olson, M. C. Richards, Dorothea Rockburne, Suzi Gablik and Susan Weil. The museum also manages image requests on behalf of the Hazel Larsen Archer Estate. Hazel Larsen Archer was the first full-time instructor of photography at Black Mountain College, and her photographs are among the most well-known documentation of the people and daily activities of the college.

BMCM+AC has been facilitating oral history documentation since 1999, resulting in a collection of recorded interviews with 69 BMC alumni as of 2019. BMCM+AC also has a research library, which includes approximately 400 BMC-related resources in audio, video and book form. These resources, in addition to the aforementioned oral histories, are available to museum visitors and members as a part the museum's publicly accessible resource center.

In addition to the museum's regional use of the collection in exhibitions, the collection is also accessed nationally and internationally by means of traveling exhibitions and loans to other institutions. Works from BMCM+AC's permanent collection have been loaned to the exhibitions Leap Before You Look: Black Mountain College (Institute of Contemporary Art, Boston Wexner Center for the Arts and Hammer Museum), Robert Rauschenberg: Among Friends at the Museum of Modern Art, Black Mountain College and Interdisciplinary Experiment 1933 - 1957 at Hamburger Bahnhof in Berlin, among others.

=== The Jargon Society ===
In 2012, BMCM+AC was chosen as the receiving institution for the remaining publications and archive of The Jargon Society, a small press publisher founded in 1951 by Jonathan Williams. The archive currently includes over 70 titles out of the total 115 Jargon titles. Of the 115 originals in the Jargon catalogue, approximately 85 are books and another 30 are broadsides, pamphlets and other publications. The museum has continued publication under the imprint. As of 2023 the latest Jargon title is a forthcoming publication, The Black Mountain College Anthology of Poetry, produced in collaboration with the University of North Carolina Press.

== Publications ==
The BMCM+AC has published numerous dossiers, exhibition catalogues and books about Black Mountain College, its teachers, and alumni.

=== Journal of Black Mountain College Studies ===
The Journal of Black Mountain College Studies (JBMCS) is a multidisciplinary online publication of the Black Mountain College Museum + Arts Center. Submissions are accepted on a rolling basis. JBMCS has published 13 volumes from 2011 to 2023.

=== Chapbooks ===
- Backpacking in the Hereafter. Poetry chapbook by M.C. Richards. Edited by Julia Connor, 2014
- Cynthia Homire: Vision Quest. Black Mountain College Museum + Arts Center, 2014
- Basil King: Between Painting and Writing. Poetry chapbook by Basil King, 2016
- Faith in Arts [chapbook series]
  - Volume 1: John Cage: Art, Life & Zen, Atelier Éditions & Black Mountain College Museum + Arts Center, 2021
  - Volume 2: Stendhal Syndrome: Art as a Transcendent Experience, Atelier Éditions & Black Mountain College Museum + Arts Center, 2021
  - Volume 3: M.C. Richards: Pots, Poems & Pedagogy, Atelier Éditions & Black Mountain College Museum + Arts Center, 2022
  - Volume 4: The Quiet House: Stillness in Lake Eden, Atelier Éditions & Black Mountain College Museum + Arts Center, 2022

=== Memoirs ===
- Black Mountain Days. Michael Rumaker, Black Mountain College Museum + Arts Center, 2003

=== Dossiers ===
The Dossiers are books focusing on specific BMC alumni and serve both as exhibition catalogues and critical studies. The museum has published dossiers featuring BMC alumni including Joseph Fiore, Fannie Hillsmith, Lore Kadden Lindenfeld, Ray Johnson, Susan Weil, Michael Rumaker, Gwendolyn Knight and Gregory Masurovsky.
