= Paulus Berensohn =

American potter (1933–2017)

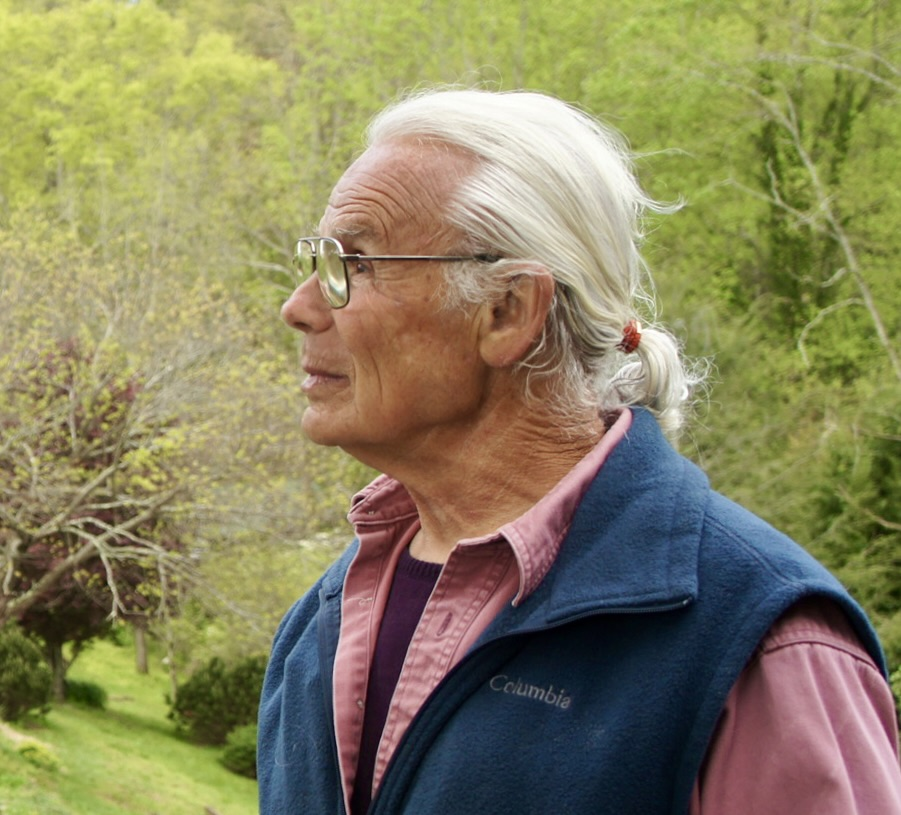
Paulus Berensohn in 2012

Paulus Berensohn (1933 – 2017) was an American potter.

== Biography ==
Born on May 14, 1933, in Brooklyn's Sheepshead Bay, Berensohn joined the Juilliard Dance Division in 1954 after three professional classes. In 1955, he moved to Bennington College, later studying with Martha Graham in New York and attending courses at Yale University and Goddard College.

During a visit to Gate Hill Cooperative in Stony Point, New York, Berensohn shifted his focus to pottery after observing ceramicist Karen Karnes. He subsequently enrolled at Haystack Mountain School of Crafts in Maine, learning from M. C. Richards.

In the 1960s, Berensohn taught pottery at Pendle Hill in Pennsylvania and Swarthmore College.

In 1965, Berensohn established the Endless Mountains Farm near Scranton, Pennsylvania.

Berensohn was an honorary fellow of the American Craft Council from 1998 and was documented in the 2013 film, To Spring From the Hand: the Life and Work of Paulus Berensohn. He authored Finding One's Way With Clay (1972), a book about pinch pots that also discussed art, the environment, and spirituality.. He was made an Honorary Member of NCECA (National Council on Education for the Ceramic Arts) in 2013.

== Bibliography ==
- Finding One's Way With Clay (1972)
