= 1952 Black Mountain College pottery seminar =

During October 15–29, 1952, a pottery seminar was held at Black Mountain College near Asheville, North Carolina, USA. This seminal event commingled Eastern and Western pottery traditions and philosophies, influencing the work of younger participants and the careers of later prominent potters. Its impact has been described as "a turning point in the modern ceramic movement".

== Participants ==
College faculty Karen Karnes and David Weinrib co-organized and led the event. Bauhaus-trained Marguerite Wildenhain traveled from her California studio at Pond Farm to be the keynote lecturer and demonstrator. Other prominent participants were Bernard Leach, Shoji Hamada, and Soetsu Yanagi. Many younger, less established potters participated including Karl Martz, and Elizabeth Crawford (pottery teacher at the Haystack Mountain School of Crafts).

The October 1952 pottery seminar was followed by a summer pottery workshop in 1953, where the featured presenters were Peter Voulkos, Warren MacKenzie, and Daniel Rhodes. One notable participant was M. C. Richards.

Despite her leadership role in these seminars, Karnes had neither title nor salary at Black Mountain College. In America in the 1950s, contributions of wives were commonly taken for granted, while their husbands received the accolades and celebrity.

== Activities ==
Participant Audrey K. Tuverson (1921-2016)

"... joined people from all over the United States – college professors, pottery teachers, home studio workers, workshop owners, and 'just plain hobby potters trying to become serious'. We talked and listened and watched from 9 in the morning until 11 at night. At first, Mr. Hamada just sat quietly, didn't say anything. ... We complained ... Then suddenly one day he opened up and talked fluent English from then on."

She described the excitement when about 30 pieces made by Hamada and Leach, having been fired in a kiln, were taken out and placed on a table.

"Each one possessed its own quality and character, vitality, and warmth. ... Each of the students at the seminar was allowed to have a piece, the choice being made from numbers drawn to determine the order in which each should take his pick. You should have seen all of us with our noses pressed firm against the windows of the pottery, watching the others make their selection."

== Credentials of key participants and impacts ==
Soetsu Yanagi (1889-1961) was a founder of the folk-craft (Mingei) movement in Japan, and was the Director of the National Folk Museum, Tokyo, Japan, and lectured on Buddhist aesthetics. Shoji Hamada (1894-1978) played a major role in reviving folk-art (mingei) ceramics in Japan, and in making Mashiko, Japan, a pottery center. Bernard Leach (1887-1979), regarded as the father of British studio pottery, was influential in introducing Western art to Japan in 1909-1920. In 1920, having returned to England, Leach and Hamada established the Leach Pottery. “Leach promoted pottery as a combination of Western and Eastern arts and philosophies.“ Marguerite Wildenhain (1896-1985) attended the Bauhaus School from 1919-1925, bringing Western sensibilities. Of Jewish ancestry, in 1940, Wildenhain fled the Nazi invasion of Holland, emigrating to the USA. American Karl Martz (1912-1997) was an admirer of Asian ceramics, and spent two sabbaticals in Japan in the 1960s and 1970s, producing works influenced by Yuzo Kondo and Totaro Sakuma. Warren MacKenzie (1924-2018) apprenticed with Bernard Leach prior to the Black Mountain College seminar, and is considered the father of American pottery in the Mingei tradition.

The show BREAKING NEW GROUND: The Studio Potter + Black Mountain College opened in 2007 at the Black Mountain College Museum + Arts Center. Curated by Bobby Gold, it featured functional works by potters who were at Black Mountain College in the 1950s, including many who attended the 1952 seminar.
