= Fiore =

Fiore means flower in Italian. It may refer to:

- Fiore (surname), notable people with the surname
- San Giovanni in Fiore, town in southern Italy (Calabria)
- Fiore (Pokémon), a region in the fictional Pokémon universe
- Sailor Moon R movie#Fiore, a character in the Sailor Moon R movie
- Fiore, a country that appears in the anime and manga series Fairy Tail
- Fiore (album), an album by Arisa Mizuki
- Fiore (film), a 2016 Italian film
- Fiore Buccieri (1907-1973), Chicago mobster
- Fiore de Henriquez (1921-2004), female Italian-British sculptor
- Fiore dei Liberi, Italian Renaissance master of arms
