= Fiore (surname) =

Fiore is a surname. Notable people with the surname include:

- Alejandro Fiore (born 1969), Argentine actor
- Angelo Aniello Fiore (died c.1500), Italian architect and sculptor
- Arlene Fiore, American professor and atmospheric chemist
- C. Richard Fiore (1931–2003), American Republican Party politician
- Chris Fiore, US film writer, director and producer
- Corentin Fiore (born 1995), Belgian footballer of Italian descent
- Dave Fiore (born 1972), American football offensive lineman
- Dean Fiore (born 1983), Australian racing driver
- Elena Fiore (1914–1983), Italian actress
- Fernando Fiore (born 1960), Argentine television personality
- Genevieve Fiore (1912–2002), American women's rights and peace activist
- Giovanni Fiore (born 1996), Canadian professional ice hockey centre
- Jasmine Lepore Fiore (1981–2009), American model and murder victim
- Jim Fiore (born 1968), Director of Athletics at Stony Brook University from 2003 to 2013
- Joachim of Fiore (c. 1135–1202), Italian theologian
- Joseph Fiore (1925–2008), American painter
- Kathryn Fiore (born 1979), American actress
- Marco Fiore (born 1989), German footballer
- Maria Fiore (1935–2004), Italian actress
- Mark Fiore (cartoonist) (born 1970), American political cartoonist
- Mark Fiore (footballer) (born 1969), English footballer
- Mauro Fiore (born 1964), Italian-American cinematographer
- Michele Ann Fiore (born 1970), American Republican politician
- Mike Fiore (baseball, born 1944), American baseball player
- Mike Fiore (baseball, born 1966), American baseball player
- Quentin Fiore (1920–2019), American graphic designer
- Raffaele Fiore (1954–2025), Italian militant, member of the Red Brigade
- Roberto Fiore (born 1959), Italian politician
- Sabrina Fiore (born 1996), Paraguayan handball player for the Paraguay national team
- Stefano Fiore (born 1975), Italian football player
- Tommaso Fiore (1884–1973), Italian Meridionalist writer and a socialist intellectual
- Toni Fiore, American TV host and cookbook author
- Tony Fiore (ice hockey) (born 1962), Canadian-Italian retired professional ice hockey centre
- Umberto Fiore (1896-1978), Italian politician

== See also ==
- Paolo Dellafiore Italian football player
