= George Sugarman =

American painter

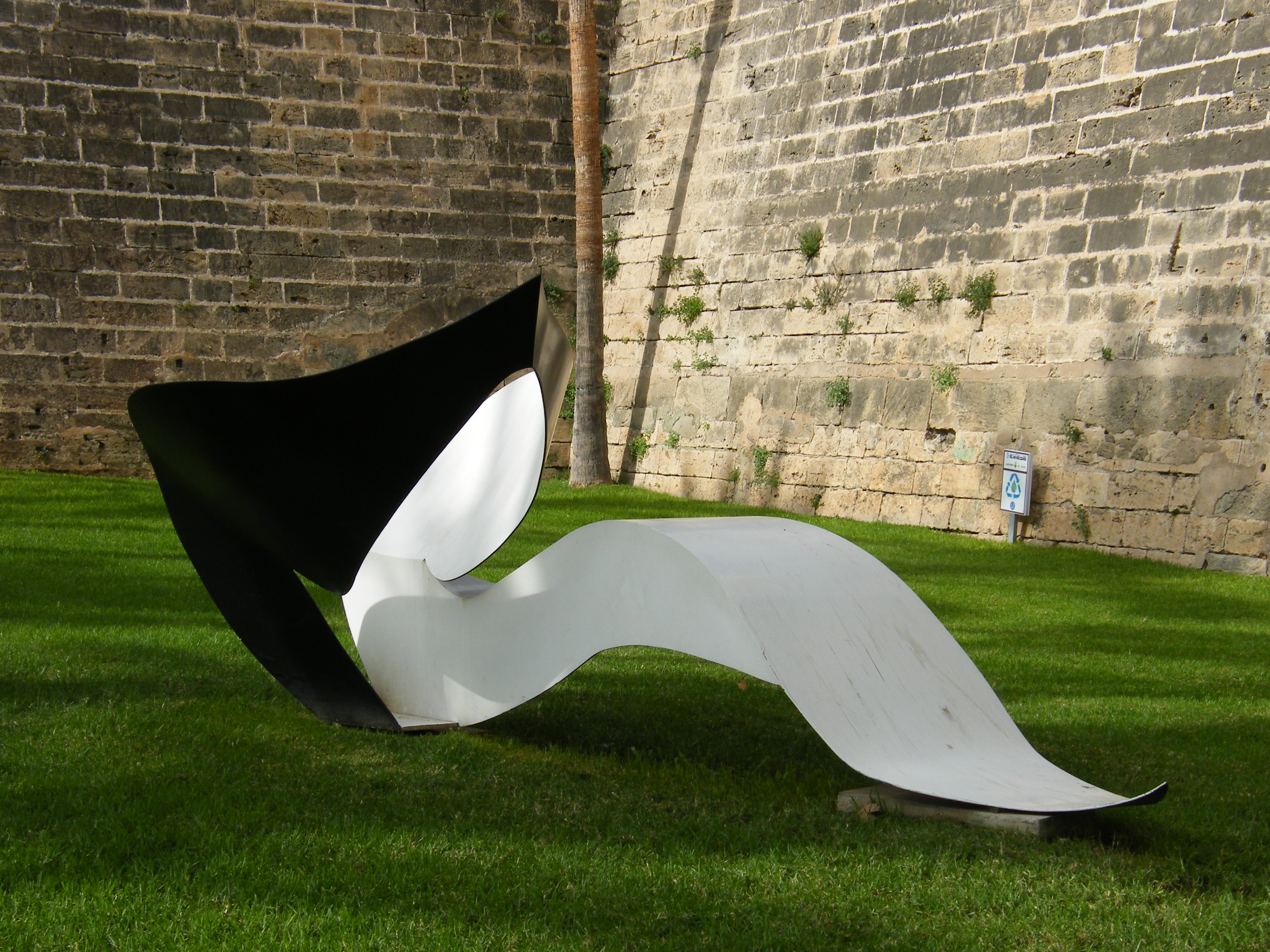
Black and White Horizontal (1993/99), by George Sugarman. Palma de Mallorca/Spain

George Sugarman (11 May 1912 – 25 August 1999) was an American artist working in the mediums of drawing, painting, and sculpture. He pioneered the concepts of pedestal-free sculpture and is best known for his large-scale, vividly painted metal sculptures. His innovative approach to art-making lent his work a fresh, experimental approach and caused him to continually expand his creative focus. During his lifetime, he was dedicated to the well-being of young emerging artists, particularly those who embraced innovation and risk-taking in their work. In his will, Sugarman provided for the establishment of The George Sugarman Foundation, Inc.

== Life and career ==
A 1934 graduate of the City College of New York, Sugarman served in the United States Navy from 1941 to 1945, assigned to the Pacific theater. He resumed his education in Paris, studying with Cubist sculptor Ossip Zadkine. He returned to New York City in 1955 at the age of 39 to begin his career as an artist. In 1965, Sugarman participated in the critically acclaimed Concrete Expressionism show curated by critic Irving Sandler at New York University, which also featured the work of sculptors Ronald Bladen and David Weinrib and painters Al Held and Knox Martin.

== Notable collections ==
- Black Prow, 1978, Lincoln National Corporation, Fort Wayne, Indiana
- Trio, 1969–71, Governor Nelson A. Rockefeller Empire State Plaza Art Collection, Albany, New York
- Cincinnati Story, at Pyramid Hill Sculpture Park and Museum, Hamilton, Ohio.
