= Lore Kadden Lindenfeld =

Lore Kadden Lindenfeld (April 27, 1921 – April 8, 2010) was a German-American textile designer. She taught visual arts at Middlesex County College. Her work has been exhibited in group and solo exhibitions internationally.

== Life and education ==
Lore Kadden Lindenfeld was born in Wuppertal, Germany, to parents Frieda and Alfred Kadden. She attended school at the Art Academy in Düsseldorf, where she studied fashion design; however, she was shortly forced to flee to the Netherlands due to Nazi rule. A year later, her family moved to the United States where she began a living as a seamstress and salesperson. Lore took classes at Harvard and attended the Institute for Social Progress at Wellesley College as well.

From 1945 to 1948 she attended Black Mountain College, graduating with a degree in Weaving and Textile Design. She worked with artists such as Anni Albers during her time there.

She earned a master's degree in Creative Arts Education from Rutgers University in 1982.

== Career ==
Lore's first post-graduate employment was as a design assistant in a textile plant in New York where she helped design women's coats and dresses. She was one of the first women to become an industrial textile designer. She then became a designer for Kanmak Textiles. Lore soon devoted her time raising her two children and as an independent weaver, creating pieces that represented her founded knowledge of patterns, colors, and designs. She started the weaving department and was a faculty member in the Visual Arts department at Middlesex County College from 1968 to 1986 and taught weaving at the Princeton Adult School for many years.

== Artistic significance ==
Lore focused primarily on weaving and fiber designs, using plastic raffia and wool fibers or ribbons. She also created some pieces using paper and ink. Her work has made appearances in exhibits throughout the world, and her work is held in the collections of the Black Mountain College Museum + Arts Center, the Fashion Institute of Technology, the Josef and Anni Albers Foundation, the Museum of Arts and Design, the National Museum of American Art, the Newark Museum of Art, the New Jersey State Museum, Rider University Art Collection, the Paley Design Center, and in private collections.

== Personal life ==
Kadden married physics professor Peter Lindenfeld in 1953. They had two children. She died in 2010.

== Major works ==
- Totem. 1981, wool, ribbons, plastic, raffia
- Triptych. 1982, wool, nylon, netting, plastic raffia
- Sado Island. 1991, polyester, Japanese paper, netting, yarn stitching and drawing
- Sado Island, Remembered Images. 1994, polyester, Japanese paper, netting, ink stitching, and drawing
- Patterns of Growth. 1998
- Transparent Forest. 1999

== Solo exhibitions ==
- Lore Lindenfeld, A Journey in Fiberarts, Princeton Day School, Princeton, NJ, 1999
- Lore Kadden Lindenfeld: A Life in Textiles, Black Mountain College Museum + Arts Center, Asheville, North Carolina, 1997
- Fibergraphics: Remembered Images, Newark Museum of Art, 1993
- Dialogue: Lindenfeld + Lindenfeld at ArtisTree, South Pomfret, Vermont
- Fiber Collage, Bargeron Gallery, Washington Crossing, PA, 1990
- Places, Spaces, and Seasons, Rider University, Lawrenceville, NJ, 1988
- Perception in Fiber, New Jersey State Museum, Trenton, NJ, 1984
- Woven Tapestries, Walters Art Gallery, Rutgers University, New Brunswick, NJ; and Henry Chauncey Conference Center, Princeton, NJ, 1982
- American Craft Gallery (later Hadler Gallery), New York, NY (with Marion Levinston), 1974
- New Jersey State Museum, Trenton, NJ (with Marion Levinston), 1973
