= Irving Sandler =

American art critic (1925–2018)

- Born: July 22, 1925; New York City, U.S.
- Died: June 2, 2018 (aged 92); New York City, U.S.
- Education: U. of Pennsylvania; New York University
- Alma mater: Temple University
- Occupations: Art critic; art historian; writer; educator; curator

Irving Sandler (July 22, 1925 – June 2, 2018) was an American art critic, art historian, and educator. He provided numerous first hand accounts of American art, beginning with abstract expressionism in the 1950s. He also managed the Tanager Gallery downtown and co-ordinated the New York Artists Club (the "Club") of the New York School from 1955 to its demise in 1962 as well as documenting numerous conversations at the Cedar Street Tavern and other art venues. Al Held named him, "Our Boswell of the New York scene," and Frank O'Hara immortalized him as the "balayeur des artistes" (sweeper-up after artists) because of Sandler's constant presence and habit of taking notes at art world events. Sandler saw himself as an impartial observer of this period, as opposed to polemical advocates such as Clement Greenberg and Harold Rosenberg.

== Biography ==
Sandler was a child of Eastern European Jewish immigrants. His parents were advocates of socialism. Sandler was born in Brooklyn. His family relocated to Philadelphia, then to Winnipeg, and finally back to Philadelphia. He served as a second lieutenant in the U.S. Marine Corps for three years in the Second World War. He received a bachelor's degree from Temple University in 1948, and a master's degree from the University of Pennsylvania in 1950. He did some additional graduate work at Columbia University, but ultimately finished a doctoral degree at New York University much later, in 1976. He started writing art criticism at the behest of Thomas B. Hess for ARTnews in 1956, and was a senior critic there through 1962. He has taught at several universities, including the Pratt Institute, New York University, and the State University of New York at Purchase, where he was appointed a founding professor in the School of Art+Design (then called the Visual Arts Division) in 1972, and where he remained until his retirement.

Sandler curated several critically acclaimed exhibitions including the "Concrete Expressionism Show" in 1965 at New York University, which featured the work of painters Al Held and Knox Martin and the sculptors Ronald Bladen, George Sugarman and David Weinrib, and "The Prospect Mountain Sculpture Show" in 1977. Sandler interviewed many American artists throughout his long career, including first generation abstract expressionists such as Robert Motherwell, Willem de Kooning, Phillip Guston, and Franz Kline in 1957 and later pop protagonists such as Tom Wesselmann in 1984. Many of these interviews are part of the Archives of American Art Oral History Program at the Smithsonian Institution, as well as available from the Irving Sandler Papers at the Getty Research Institute. In 1972, he co-founded the not-for-profit alternative gallery Artists Space with Trudie Grace, which helped launch the careers of Judy Pfaff, Barbara Kruger and Cindy Sherman amongst others.

As indicated in the bibliography below, Sandler authored several monographs on individual artists as well as a sweeping, four-volume survey of contemporary art (The Triumph of American Painting: A History of Abstract Expressionism (1970), The New York School: The Painters and Sculptors of the Fifties (1978), American Art of the 1960s (1988), and Art of the Postmodern Era: From the Late 1960s to the Early 1990s (1996). Robert Storr has described the history, "Narrative, untheoretical--at times antitheoretical--and unapologetically focused not just on what happened in the United States but principally on what happened in Manhattan, Sandler's surveys have been widely criticized but even more widely used, not least because they are readable and deeply informed by their author's unrivaled access to the artists and art-worldings about whom he writes." Sandler continued to write about art during his final years and was concerned with readdressing his earlier "canonical" works on abstract expressionism with the benefit of historical distance. In 2009 he published Abstract Expressionism and the American Experience: a Reevaluation. His first novel, Goodbye to Tenth Street, was published posthumously in late 2018.

Sandler died on June 2, 2018, at the age of 92.

== Selected works ==
- Irving Sandler (1956). "Essay". Tanager Gallery 1952-56. New York: The Tanager Gallery.
- Goosen, E. C.; Goldwater, Robert; Sandler, Irving (1959). Three American Sculptors: Ferber, Hare, Lassaw. Grove Press.
- Irving Sandler (1959). Joan Mitchell, School of New York: Some Younger Artists. New York: Grove Press.
- Irving Sandler (1959). "Ibram Lassaw". Three American Sculptors. New York: Grove Press.
- Irving Sandler (1959). "Introduction". Tanager Gallery: Exhibition of Paintings and Sculpture. New York: Tanager Gallery.
- Irving Sandler (1962). "Paul Burlin". Paul Burlin. New York: American Federation of Arts.
- Irving Sandler (1963). "Al Held". Toward a New Abstraction. New York: Jewish Museum.
- Irving Sandler (1963). "James Brooks and the abstract inscape". ARTnews. New York: Art Foundation. OCLC 54034429.
- Irving Sandler (1964). "George Sugarman". Recent American Sculpture. New York: Jewish Museum.
- Irving Sandler (1965). Concrete Expressionism. New York: New York University Art Collection.
- Irving Sandler (1966). Two Decades of American Painting. Museum of Modern Art.
- Irving Sandler (1966). "Interview with Paul Brach, May 5, 1962". Paul Brach. New York: New York University Art Collection.
- Irving Sandler (1967). "Gesture and Non-Gesture in Recent Sculpture". American Sculpture of the 1960s. Los Angeles: Los Angeles County Museum of Art.
- Irving Sandler (1967). Sculpture in Environment. New York: NYC Administration of Recreation.
- Irving Sandler (1968). Gregory Battcock (ed.). "Gesture and Non-Gesture in Recent Sculpture". Minimal Art: A Critical Anthology. New York: E.P.Dutton.
- Irving Sandler (1969). "Introduction". Critic's Choice 1969-70. New York: New York State Council on the Arts and the State University of New York.
- Irving Sandler (1970). Amerikanischer Abstrakter Expressionismus. Herrsching Ammersee: Pawlak Verlag.
- David W. Ecker; Jerome J. Hausman; Irving Sandler (1970). Conference on Art Criticism and Art Education. New York: New York University.
- Irving Sandler (May 1971). "George Sugarman". Sugarman: Sculptural Complex in an Urban Area, the First National Bank of Saint Paul.
- Irving Sandler (1971). "Introduction". 20th-Century Painting & Sculpture from the New York University Art Collection. New York: New York University.
- Irving Sandler (1972). "Abstract Expressionism". Contemporary Art 1942-72: Collection of the Albright-Knox Art Gallery. New York: Praeger Publishers.
- Irving Sandler (1973). "New Ways of Teaching Art History". New Ideas in Art Education: A Critical Anthology. New York: E.P. Dutton.
- Irving Sandler (1973). "Interview". Rudolph Baranik: Napalm Elegy. New York: Lerner-Heller Gallery.
- Irving Sandler (1974). "1946–1960". The Hirshhorn Museum and Sculpture Garden. New York: Harry N. Abrams.
- Irving Sandler (1975). "Foreword". Bradley Walker Tomlin: A Retrospective View. Hempstead, New York: Emily Lowe Gallery.
- Irving Sander (1976). "Paintings 1947–1952". Hans Hofmann: The Years 1947-1952. New York: Andre Emmerich Gallery.
- Irving Sandler (1976). "Conversation with Irving Sandler". Fay Lansner. Swarthmore, Pa.: Ava Books.
- Irving Sandler (1977). "New York Schooled in the Fifties". Alex Katz: Twenty Five Years of Painting. London: The Saatchi Gallery.
- Irving Sandler (1977). The triumph of American painting : a history of abstract expressionism. New York: Harper and Row. ISBN 0-06-430075-7. OCLC 16378551.
- Irving Sandler; Douglas Davis (1977). "Introduction". Art Culture: Essays on the Post-Modern. New York: Icon Editions: Harper & Row.
- Irving Sandler (1977). "Adolph Gottlieb". Adolph Gottlieb: Paintings 1945-1974. New York: Andre Emmerich Gallery.
- Irving Sandler (1977). "The American Years". Hans Hofmann. United Kingdom: Museum of Modern Art, Oxford.
- Irving Sandler (1978). The New York School: The Painters and Sculptors of the Fifties. New York: Harper & Row. pp. 174–195. ISBN 0-06-438505-1.
- Irving Sandler (September 1978). Abe Ajay/Selections 1964-1978. Purchase, N.Y.: Neuberger Museum.
- Irving Sandler (1978). "Introduction". Mary Frank: Sculpture/Drawing/Prints. Purchase, NY: Neuberger Museum.
- Irving Sandler (1978). "Foreword". Allan d'Arcangelo: Paintings of the Early Sixties. New York: Neuberger Museum.
- Irving Sandler (1978). "The Line: As Form and Metaphor". Questions New York Moscow New York Moscow. San Francisco: San Francisco Museum of Modern Art.
- Irving Sandler (1979). "Artists Space". 10 Artists/Artists Space. Purchase, N.Y.: Neuberger Museums.
- Irving Sandler (1979). "Art as Auto-Image". Images of Self. Hampshire College.
- Irving Sandler (1979). Alex Katz. New York: Hudson Hills.
- Irving Sanler (1979). "Introduction". The Prospect Mountain Sculpture Show: An Homage to David Smith. Lake George, NY: Lake George Arts Project.
- Irving Sandler (1979). "Abstract Expressionism". The New York School 1940-1960: The First Generation of Abstract Expressionism. Reno, NV: Sierra Nevada Museum of Art.
- Irving Sandler (1979). "Introduction". Michael Torlen/Seven Planets. Purchase, NY: Neuberger Museum.
- Irving Sandler (1979). "The Sculpture of Richard Stankiewicz". The Sculpture of Richard Stankiewicz: A Selection of Works from the Years 1953-1979. Troy: University Art Gallery SUNY Albany.
- Irving Sandler (1980). "Al Held: 1959–1961". Al Held: 1959-1961. New York: Andre Emmerich Gallery.
- Irving Sandler (1980). "Interview with Rosalind Bengelsdorf Browne". Byron Browne (1907-1961): Paintings and Gouaches, C. 1950. New York: Washburn Gallery.
- Irving Sandler (1981). "George Sugarman and Construction Sculpture in the 1960s". Shape of Space: The Sculpture of George Sugarman. Omaha, Nebraska: Joslyn Art Museum.
- Irving Sandler (1981). "Alex Katz 1957–1959". Alex Katz 1957-1959. New York: Robert Miller Gallery.
- Irving Sandler (1981). "The School of Art at Yale: The Collective Reminiscences of Twenty Distinguished Alumni". 20 Artists: Yale School of Art 1950-1970. New Haven: Yale University Art Gallery.
- Irving Sandler (1981). "Provincetown in the Fifties: A Memoir". The Sun Gallery: An Exhibition at Provincetown Art Association and Museum. Provincetown: Provincetown Art Association.
- Irving Sandler (1982). Concepts in Construction: 1910–1980. New York: Independent Curators Incorporated.
- Irving Sandler (1982). Al Held: 1954–1959. New York: Robert Miller.
- Irving Sandler (1982). "Statement". Abstract Painting: 1960-69. New York: P.S. 1.
- Irving Sandler (1982). Philip Pearlstein. New York: Alpine.
- Irving Sandler (1982). Concepts in Construction: 1910–1980. New York: Independent Curators Incorporated.
- Irving Sandler (1982). "Essay". Balcomb Greene. New York: ACA Galleries.
- Irving Sandler (1982). "Douglas Davis: The Drawings". Douglas Davis: Video, Obietky, Grafika. Warsaw: Muzeum Sztuki.
- Irving Sandler (1983). Mark Rothko: Paintings 1948–1969. New York: Pace Gallery Publications.
- Irving Sandler (1985). Al Held. New York: Hudson Hills.
- Irving Sandler; Amy Newman, eds. (1986). Introduction, Defining Modern Art: Selected Writings of Alfred H. Barr, Jr. New York: Harry N. Abrams.
- Irving Sandler (1987). Introduction, The Empire State Collection: Art for the Public. New York: Harry N. Abrams.
- Irving Sandler (October 1988). American Art of the 1960s. New York: Harper and Row. ISBN 978-0-06-438507-7.
- Irving Sandler (1991). Brower Hatcher: Structures. New York: Center for International Contemporary Arts.
- Irving Sandler (1993). Roy Neuberger: Patron of the Arts. Purchase, N.Y: State University of New York at Purchase.
- Irving Sandler (1993). "Agnes Martin Interviewed by Irving Sandler," Agnes Martin: Paintings and Drawings 1977–1991. London: Serpentine Gallery.
- Irving Sandler (1996). Art of the Postmodern Era: From the Late 1960s to the Early 1990s. New York: IconEditions. ISBN 0-06-438509-4.
- Irving Sandler (1999). Stephen Antonakos. Hudson Hills Press. ISBN 978-1-55595-164-1.
- Irving Sandler (March 1999). Natvar Bhavsar: Painting and the Reality of Color. Fine Art Publishing. ISBN 90-5704-061-1.
- Irving Sandler (2003). A Sweeper-up After Artists: A Memoir. Thames and Hudson. ISBN 978-0-500-23813-4.
- Irving Sandler (December 2003). Judy Pfaff. Hudson Hills Press. ISBN 978-1-55595-222-8. Introduction by Russell Panczenko.
- Irving Sandler (January 2005). "Deconstructive Constructivist". Art in America: 111–115.
- Irving Sandler (2006). From Avant-Garde to Pluralism: An On-The-Spot History. Hard Press Editions. ISBN 978-1-889097-68-8. A collection of Sandler's writings spanning six decades.
- Irving Sandler (2009). Abstract Expressionism and the American Experience: a Reevaluation. Hudson Hills Press. ISBN 978-1-55595-311-9. Foreword by Raphael Rubinstein.
- Irving Sandler (2010). The Collector As Patron in the Twentieth Century. New York: Knoedler Gallery.
- Irving Sandler (2015). Swept Up By Art: An Art Critic in the Post-Avant-Garde Era. New York: Rail Editions, 2015.
- Irving Sandler (2018). Goodbye to Tenth Street. Seattle, WA: Pleasure Boat Studio: A Literary Press, 2018.
