= Mark Pharis =

American ceramic artist and professor

Mark Pharis is an American ceramic artist and professor. He is the Chair of the Department of Art at the University of Minnesota, where he has been a faculty member since 1985. As of 2022, he was named a Fellow of the American Craft Council.

== Biography and artwork ==
Pharis studied ceramics at the University of Minnesota under Warren MacKenzie. Between 1971 and 1985, Pharis was employed by various universities, mostly in the American Midwest, as a visiting faculty member, sabbatical replacement and summer session faculty. During this time Pharis's work was featured in several group and two person shows as well as solo exhibitions. In 1985, Pharis became a professor in the Department of Art at the University of Minnesota, where he has also served as the Chair of the Department.

Pharis's work often makes uses of clay to make functional vessels. His work can be found in the collections of the Victoria and Albert Museum in London, the Gardner Museum in Toronto, Arizona State University in Tempe, Arizona, the Ferguson Collection, the Kansas City Art Institute, the Woodman Collection at the University of Colorado Boulder, the Everson Museum, and Los Angeles County Museum of Art, among others.

Pharis lives in Roberts, Wisconsin.
