= Ronald Bladen =

Canadian-American painter and sculptor (1918–1988)

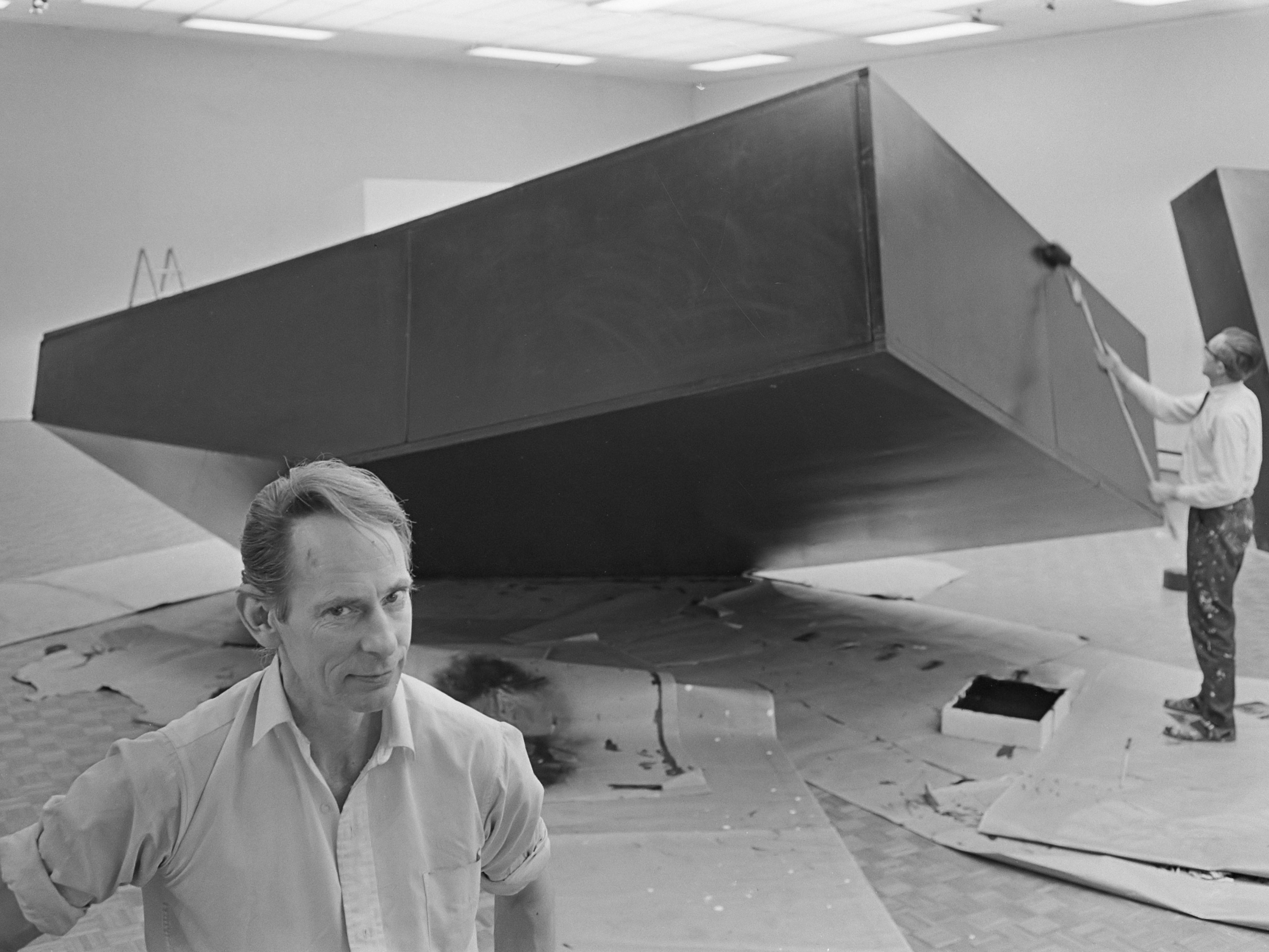
- Ronald Bladen (1968)
- Born: July 13, 1918; Vancouver, Canada
- Died: February 3, 1988 (aged 69); New York City, New York, US
- Known for: Painter, sculptor
- Website: ronaldbladenestate.com

Ronald Bladen (July 13, 1918 – February 3, 1988) was a Canadian-born American painter and sculptor. He is particularly known for his large-scale sculptures. His artistic stance, was influenced by European Constructivism, American Hard-Edge Painting, and sculptors such as Isamu Noguchi and David Smith. Bladen in turn had stimulating effect on a circle of younger artists including Carl Andre, Donald Judd, Sol LeWitt and others, who repeatedly referred to him as one of the 'father figures' of Minimal Art.

== Early life ==
Charles Ronald Wells Bladen was born on July 13, 1918, to Muriel Beatrice Tylecote and Kenneth Bladen, both British immigrants living in Vancouver, Canada. In 1922 the family moved to the Washington state before returning to Canada to live in Victoria, British Columbia in 1932. The artist displayed his love of art at a young age. At ten years old Bladen began drawing intensively, making copies of works by Titian, Picasso and Matisse. In 1937 the artist enrolled in the Vancouver School of Art where he studied until 1939.

== San Francisco ==
In 1939 the artist moved to San Francisco, where he enrolled in the California School of Fine Arts. In 1941, when drafted and subsequently declared unfit for service, the artist was obliged to work as a ship's welder at the navy dockyards. Using the skills he learned in this capacity the artist supported himself for years as a toolmaker.

In 1946 Bladen traveled to Tijuana, Mexico, New Orleans and New York on a grant from the San Francisco Art Association. In 1948 he was married to the actress Barbara Gross. They separated in 1955. During this time he also befriended the writers Jack Kerouac, Henry Miller and Allen Ginsberg.

== New York ==
In 1956, Bladen moved to New York, where he lived on Houston Street. Through Al Held he met George Sugarman and Nicholas Krushenick and John Krushenick, who together founded the Brata Gallery co-operative in 1957. The artist's paintings from this period mark a departure from his earlier romantic works. They are defined by highly concentrated segments of color set against monochromatic backgrounds. In 1960, he took over Al Held's studio at 5 West 21st Street, where he began to focus on making collages of folded paper and large scale plywood relief paintings. In 1962, he exhibited his plywood paintings for the first time at the Brata Gallery and the Green Gallery in New York. The following year he made his first free-standing, colored sculptures from plywood boards with metal struts. From this time on the artist dedicated himself exclusively to sculpture.

In 1964, he showed his first sculpture, White Z, at an exhibition in the Park Place Gallery in New York where he befriended Connie Reyes, who later became his companion. He was awarded the National Medal of Arts by the National Endowment of the Arts. In 1965, Bladen participated in the critically acclaimed Concrete Expressionism show curated by critic Irving Sandler at New York University, which also featured the work of sculptors George Sugarman and David Weinrib and painters Al Held and Knox Martin. In 1966, Bladen showed a tripartite work made the previous year, Three Elements, at the exhibition, Primary Structures Younger American and British Artists, in the Jewish Museum in New York. A seminal moment in the history of sculpture, this exhibition brought the language of minimal sculpture into the public eye. Artists represented in the exhibition include Carl Andre, Dan Flavin, Donald Judd, Sol LeWitt, Walter De Maria Robert Morris and others.

In 1967 he was included in the Scale as Content exhibition at the Corcoran Gallery of Art in Washington, which brought together important sculptures by Bladen, Barnett Newman and Tony Smith, he showed his monumental sculpture, The X.

Starting in 1967 he received a number of important public commissions, was represented in 1968 at documenta 4 in Kassel, and was among the circle of artists presented to a European art public under the title, Minimal Art, West Berlin. In 1970, he was awarded a John Simon Guggenheim Memorial Foundation Fellowship.

== Teaching ==
From 1974 to 1976, Bladen taught as a guest lecturer at Columbia University in New York and was awarded the Mark Rothko Fellowship in 1975. In 1976, Bladen was appointed teacher at the Parsons The New School for Design, a post he held until 1978 and he also taught at the School of Visual Arts. He was an Artist in Residence in 1981–82 at the Skowhegan School of Painting and Sculpture (Maine), and in 1982–83 as a guest lecturer at Yale University in New Haven (Connecticut). In 1977, he was once again awarded the National Endowment of the Arts.

== Public commissions ==
Starting in 1967 Ronald Bladen received a number of important public commissions including: The Cathedral Evening for the Governor Nelson A. Rockefeller Empire State Plaza Art Collection in Albany, New York, 1969, Vroom Sh-Sh-Sh for Buffalo, New York, 1974, Raiko I for Galerie Schmela in Düsseldorf, 1975, Cosmic Seed for Des Moines (Iowa), 1977, Kama Sutra for Central Park, New York, New York, 1978, Oracle’s Vision for Springfield, Ohio in 1981, Black Lightning for Seattle and the King Faisal University in Riyadh, Host of the Ellipse for Baltimore, Maryland, in 1981, and Sonar Tide for Peoria, Illinois, in 1983.

== Selected exhibitions ==
- 1956 Paintings by Ronald Bladen, Fine Art Gallery, University of British Columbia, Vancouver, BC
- 1965 Concrete Expressionism, Loeb Student Center, New York University, New York, NY
- 1966 Primary Structures. Younger American and British Sculptors, The Jewish Museum, New York, NY
- 1966–67 Annual Exhibition 1966, Contemporary American Sculpture and Prints, Whitney Museum of American Art, New York, NY
- 1967 Ronald Bladen: Sculpture, Emily Lowe Gallery, Hofstra University, Hempstead, NY
- Bladen, Grosvenor, von Schlegell, Loeb Student Center, New York University, New York, NY
- American Sculpture of the Sixties, Los Angeles County Museum of Art, Los Angeles, CA, traveling to Philadelphia Museum of Art, Philadelphia PA
- Structural Art, American Federation of Art, New York, NY, traveling
- Rejective Art, University of Omaha, Fine Arts Festival, Omaha, NE
- Guggenheim International Exhibition, 1967: Sculpture from Twenty Nations, The Solomon R Guggenheim Museum, New York, NY
- 1967–68 Scale as Content: Ronald Bladen, Barnett Newman, Tony Smith, The Corcoran Gallery of Art, Washington DC
- 1968 documenta 4, Kassel, Germany Minimal Art (Andre, Bladen, Flavin, Grosvenor, Judd, LeWitt, Morris, Smith, Smithson, Steiner) Gmeentemuseum, The Hague, The Netherlands, traveling to: Städtische Kunsthalle und Kunstverein für die Rheinlande und Westfalen, Düsseldorf; Akademie der ssünste, Berlin Annual Exhibition
- 1968, Contemporary American Sculpture, Whitney Museum of American Art, New York, NY
- 1969 14 Sculptors: The Industrial Edge, The Walker Art Center, Minneapolis, MN
- 1970 American Sculpture, Sheldon Memorial Art Gallery, The University of Nebraska, Lincoln, NE
- 1972 Ronald Bladen and Allan d'Arcangelo, Elvehjem Art Center, University of Wisconsin, Madison, WI
- 1973 Biennial Exhibition: Contemporary American Art, Whitney Museum of American Art, New York, NY
- Art in Space: Some Turning Points, The Detroit Institute of Arts, Detroit, MI
- 1974 Less is More: The Influence of the Bauhaus on American Art, Lowe Art Museum, University of Miami, Coral Gables, FL, traveling to the New York Cultural Center, New York, NY
- 1975 The Martha Jackson Collection at the Albright-Knox Art Gallery, Albright- Knox Art Gallery, Buffalo, NY
- 1976 200 Years of American Sculpture, Whitney Museum of American Art, New York, NY
- The Golden Door: Artist-Immigrants of America 1876-1976, Hirshhorn Museum and Sculpture Garden, Washington, DC
- 1977 Project: New Urban Monuments, Akron Art Institute, Akron, OH
- 1979 The Minimal Tradition, Aldrich Museum of Contemporary Art, Ridgefield, CT
- Contemporary Sculpture: Selections from the Museum of Modern Art, Museum of Modern Art, New York, NY
- 1986 Sculpture on the Wall, The Aldrich Museum of Contemporary Art, Ridgefield, CT
- 1991 Ronald Bladen: Early and Late, San Francisco Museum of Modern Art, San Francisco, CA, traveling to Vancouver Art Museum, Vancouver, BC
- 1995 Ronald Bladen: Drawings and Sculptural Models, Weatherspoon Art Gallery, The University of North Carolina, Greensboro, NC, traveling to Sculpture Center, Long Island City, NY
- Beat Culture and the New America: 1950–1965, Whitney Museum of American Art, New York, NY, traveling to: The Walker Art Center, Minneapolis, MN; MH de Young Memorial Museum, Fine Arts Museum of San Francisco, San Francisco, CA
- 1996 The San Francisco School of Abstract Expressionism, Laguna Art Museum, Los Angeles, CA, traveling to San Francisco Museum of Modern Art, San Francisco, CA
- 1998 Ronald Bladen Sculpture, Kunsthalle Bielefeld, Bielefeld, Germany
- 1999 Ronald Bladen: Selected Works, PS1/ MoMA Contemporary Art Center, Long Island City, NY
- 2000 „Kontrapunkt“, Werke von Nam June Paik and Ronald Bladen, RWE-Turm, Essen, Germany
- 2004 A Minimal Future? Art as Object. 1958–1968, The Museum of Contemporary Art Los Angeles, Los Angeles, CA
- 2007 Ronald Bladen-Skulptur. Werke der Sammlung Marzona, Staatliche Museen zu Berlin, Neue Nationalgalerie, Berlin, Germany
