= Suzi Gablik =

American artist and art critic (1934–2022)

- Gablik, photo courtesy of Deborah Solomon
- Born: September 26, 1934; New York City, U.S.
- Died: May 7, 2022 (aged 87); Blacksburg, Virginia, U.S.
- Education: Black Mountain College; Hunter College, BA
- Known for: art historian, writer, painter
- Notable work: Has Modernism Failed?, The Reenchantment of Art
- Awards: National Lifetime Achievement Award, Women's Caucus for Art, 2003

Suzi Gablik (September 26, 1934 – May 7, 2022) was an American visual artist, author, art critic, and professor of art history and art criticism. She lived in Blacksburg, Virginia.

== Early life and education ==
Gablik was born in New York City on September 26, 1934. Her interest in art was piqued after visiting museums in her hometown with her father during her childhood. In 1951, after a summer studying at Black Mountain College, she entered Hunter College where she studied with Robert Motherwell. She graduated with a Bachelor of Arts in 1955.

As a graduation gift from her parents, she travelled to Europe, but on her return she fell out with her parents over a love affair and had to rely on her own resources. Dollie Chareau, the widow of Pierre Chareau, let her stay in Chareau's studio, and she began working for George Wittenborn, a dealer in art books and small-press publisher as a clerk at Wittenborn's bookstore and assistant with his publishing. This was the beginning of her work in art publishing and art history.

== Writing career ==
Gablik wrote articles for Art in America (for which she was the London correspondent for fifteen years), ARTnews (1962–1966), Times Literary Supplement, and The New Criterion, as well as for blogs.

Gablik's first book was Pop Art Redefined, co-authored with art critic John Russell. Her other books include: Progress in Art (1977), Has Modernism Failed? (1982), The Reenchantment of Art (1992), Conversations Before the End of Time (1995), Living the Magical Life: An Oracular Adventure (2002), and Magritte (1970), about the Belgian surrealist René Magritte, written while living with the Magrittes.

Gablik's The Reenchantment of Art announced her disenchantment with "the compulsive and oppressive consumeristic framework in which we do our work," and argued that a re-connection to the primordial and to ritual might allow "for a return of soul." Instead of traditional forms of religion, however, Gablik sought out contemporary art that she believed broke out of the Western framework, championing the work of artists such as Frank Gohlke, Gilah Yelin Hirsch, Nancy Holt, Dominique Mazeaud, Fern Shaffer and Otello Anderson, Starhawk, James Turrell, and Mierle Laderman Ukeles, in the book and in subsequent critical writing.

In addition to her critical articles, Gablik conducted interviews with other artists, art critics or philosophers, such as Richard Shusterman. She also wrote essays for exhibition catalogues of shows that she has curated.

Her papers are held at the Smithsonian Institution's Archives of American Art.

== Teaching ==
Gablik taught at Virginia Commonwealth University's School of the Arts and Washington and Lee University, and has lectured at many others. From 1976 to 1979, she participated in U.S. International Communications Agency lecture tours in India, Hungary, Pakistan, and countries of South Asia. She also participated in the Mountain Lake Symposium in 1986 and again in 1989.

== Collections and exhibitions ==
Gablik's art work is in the permanent collection of the Smithsonian American Art Museum and the Black Mountain College Museum collection.

Her work has been exhibited at the Museum of Modern Art, New York.

== Personal life and death ==
Gablik was in a brief relationship with Harry Torczyner after her graduation. She died on May 7, 2022, at her home in Blacksburg, Virginia. She was 87, and suffered from a long unspecified illness prior to her death.

== Awards and honors ==
In 2003, Gablik was awarded a National Lifetime Achievement Award for outstanding achievement in the visual arts by the Women's Caucus for Art.
