= Karen Karnes =

American ceramist (1925–2016)

- Born: November 17, 1925; New York, New York
- Died: July 12, 2016 (aged 90); Morgan, Vermont
- Education: Brooklyn College
- Known for: Ceramics

Karen Karnes (November 17, 1925 – July 12, 2016) was an American ceramist, best known for her salt glazed, earth-toned stoneware ceramics.

== Early life ==
Karnes was born on November 17, 1925 in New York City, where she attended art schools for children. Her garment worker parents were Russian and Polish Jewish immigrants, and the family lived in the Bronx Coops.

Karnes applied for and was accepted to the High School of Music & Art. As a child she was surrounded by urban realities and visual influences, but she claims that her parents' old-world ideals kept her grounded. At Brooklyn College she majored in design and graduated in 1946. After graduating, she studied abroad in Italy, where she continued to study ceramics.

After returning from Italy, Karnes began a graduate program at New York State College of Ceramics at Alfred University, but left before completing her degree to work at Black Mountain College.

== Black Mountain College ==
Karnes first encountered Black Mountain Collegein 1947, where she took a summer design class with Josef Albers.

In 1952, she and her husband David Weinrib (whom she later divorced) moved down to North Carolina to become potters-in-residence at the Black Mountain College. While at Black Mountain College, Karnes and Weinrib became acquainted with Merce Cunningham and John Cage, and later lived with them at the Gate Hill Cooperative.

During the Pottery Seminar held at the College in 1952, Karnes met international potters Bernard Leach, Shoji Hamada, and Marguerite Wildenhain, as well as Karl Martz and local potters Malcom Davis and Mark Shapiro. She was involved with the Southern Highland Craft Guild (then known as the Southern Highland Handicraft Guild) during her stay in North Carolina, selling her work in downtown Asheville.

== Gate Hill Community ==
Karnes lived at Gate Hill Cooperative in Stony Point, New York, for twenty-five years. She moved to the community in 1954, leaving Black Mountain College before its closing. At Gate Hill, she built her own studio and kilns, and worked with M.C. Richards and a local ceramics engineer to develop and popularize a flameproof clay body. With this clay, Karnes began making oven-top casserole dishes, a design she produced for over fifty years.

== Later life ==
In 1967, Karnes first experimented with salt-firing at a workshop at the Penland School of Crafts.

Karnes' later work dealt with contemporary vessels, which were given different attention to design than her original pottery.[2] She made many traditionally functional forms and contemporary forms, but she also continued to produce casseroles, teapots, cups and bowls.

Another of her most well-known forms was the cut-lid jar, a form she first made at a workshop with Paulus Berensohn. Karnes continued to experiment with this form from the late 1960s until she stopped throwing.

In the late 1970s Karnes moved to Vermont with her partner Ann Stannard. She decided to live the rest of her life on a farm, working with clay and using old firing practices such as wood and salt firing. In 1998, her house and studio burned to the ground because of a kiln fire. With the help of donations from a large pottery sale, Karen rebuilt her country house and studio. She received a graduate fellowship from Alfred University, and won a gold medal for the consummate craftsmanship from The American Craft Council. In 1976 she was named a Fellow of the American Craft Council.

Karnes died on July 12, 2016, in Morgan, Vermont.

Her work is in the Asheville Art Museum, the Brooklyn Museum, the Detroit Institute of Art, the Metropolitan Museum of Art, the Museum of Arts and Design, the Museum of Fine Arts, Boston, the Philadelphia Museum of Art, the Smithsonian American Art Museum, and the Victoria and Albert Museum.

== Bibliography ==
- "Interview with Karen Karnes." Smithsonian Archives of American Art, August 9–10, 2005
- "Ceramics, Sculpture and Contemporary Art." Ferrin Gallery, 2006
- Don't Know We'll See: The Work of Karen Karnes – Website for a film about Karen Karnes
