= Peter Lindenfeld =

Austrian and American physicist (1925–2025)

Peter Lindenfeld (March 10, 1925 – November 21, 2025) was an Austrian and American physicist. He was professor emeritus of Physics and Astronomy at Rutgers University.

== Early life and education ==
Lindenfeld was born in Vienna, Austria, in 1925. His parents worked in medicine. He and his family left Austria one month after the Nazi takeover in March 1938, when he was thirteen years old. The family eventually settled in Vancouver, British Columbia.

Lindenfeld received a Bachelor of Applied Science in Electrical Engineering and a Master of Applied Science in Physics Engineering from the University of British Columbia. He received a PhD from Columbia University in 1954.

== Career ==
Lindenfeld came to Rutgers in 1953. He became a professor in 1966. At Rutgers, he researched metals, with a particular focus on superconductivity. During his time at Rutgers, he made an effort to be a bridge between research and teaching, which included mentoring high school teachers. He retired in 1999.

In 2011, Lindenfeld and Suzanne White Brahmia authored the high school textbook, Physics: The First Science. The 350-page "terse and concise, yet informative and complete" algebra-based physics textbook was written for a two-semester college physics course.

== Personal life and death ==
Lindenfeld married textile artist Lore Kadden in 1953. They had two children. Kadden died in 2010. Lindenfeld died on November 21, 2025, at the age of 100.

== Awards and honors ==
Lindenfeld was elected a fellow of the American Physical Society in 1974.

In 1989, Lindenfeld received the Robert A. Millikan award, which is awarded for "notable and creative contributions to the teaching of physics."

In 2001, an anonymous donor made a multi-million dollar gift to the Rutgers Department of Physics and Astronomy. The gift created the Peter Lindenfeld Chair in Experimental Condensed-Matter Physics.

== Books ==
- With Suzanne White Brahmia Physics: The First Science (Rutgers University Press, 2011)
- Fragments of Time: From a Secure Childhood in Prewar Vienna to the Challenges of Emigration, Adaptation, and Pursuits in Science and in Educational and Social Change (Random Walk Books, 2021)
