= Morris Kantor =

Belarusian-born American painter

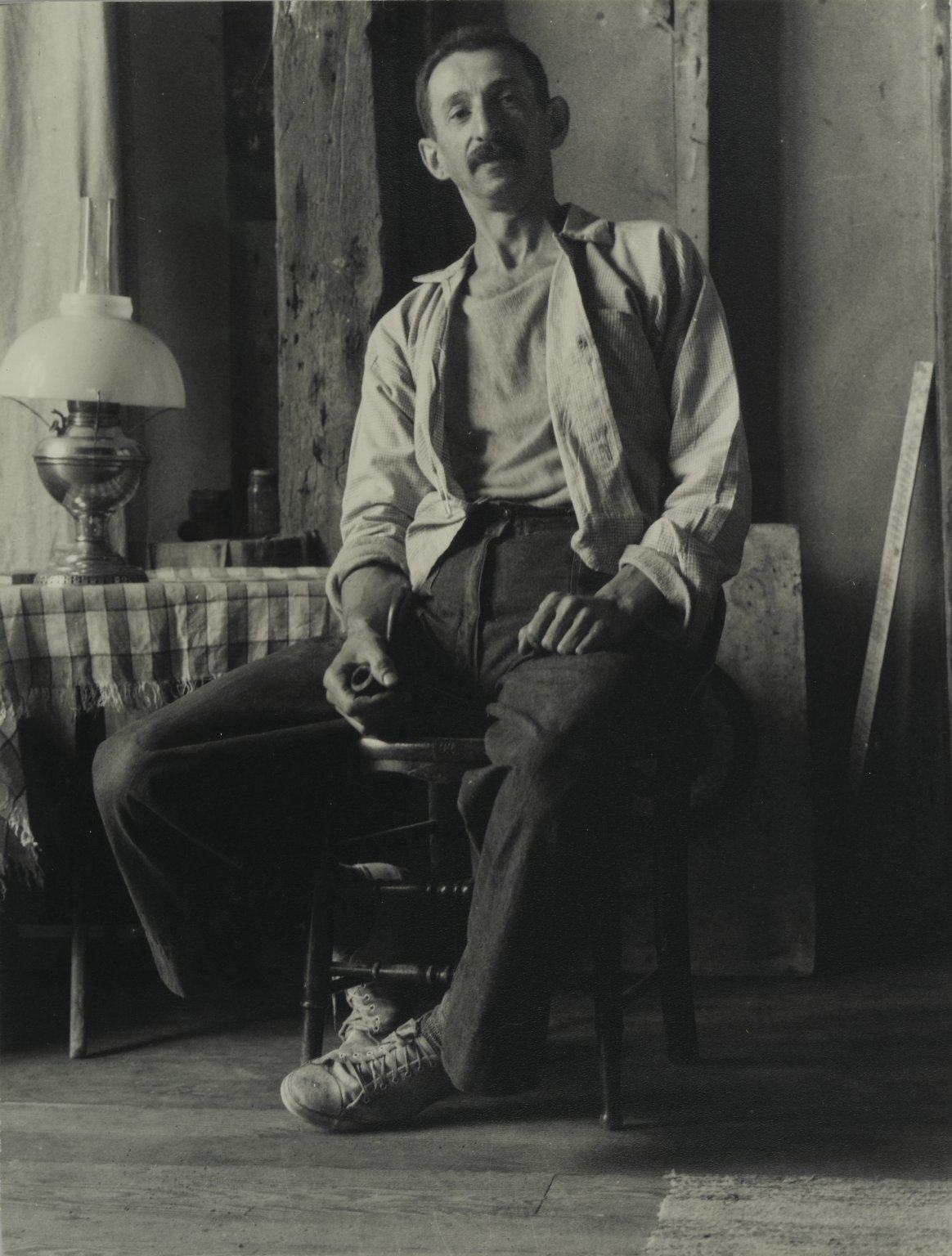
- Portrait of Kantor by Consuelo Kanaga, 1938
- Born: April 15, 1896; Minsk, Russian Empire
- Died: January 31, 1974 (aged 77); West Nyack, New York, US
- Education: Independent School of Art (New York City)
- Known for: Painter
- Notable work: Baseball At Night (1934)
- Spouse: Martha Ryther

Morris Kantor (Belarusian: Морыс Кантор) (1896–1974) was a Belarusian-born American painter based in the New York City area.

== Life ==
Born in Minsk on April 15, 1896, Kantor was brought to the United States in 1906 at age 10, in order to join his father who had previously emigrated there. He made his home in West Nyack, New York for much of his life, and died there in 1974. He produced a prolific and diverse body of work, much of it in the form of paintings, which is distinguished by its stylistic variety over his long career.

Perhaps his most widely recognized work is the iconic painting "Baseball At Night", which depicts an early night baseball game played under artificial electric light. Although he is best known for his paintings executed in a realistic manner, over the course of his life he also spent time working in styles such as Cubism and Futurism, and produced a number of abstract or non-figural works.

Kantor found employment in the Garment District upon his arrival in New York City, and was not able to begin formal art studies until 1916, when he began courses at the now-defunct Independent School of Art under the instruction of Homer Boss. Later in his career, Kantor himself was an instructor at the Cooper Union and also at the Art Students League of New York in the 1940s, and taught many pupils who later became famous artists in their own right, such as Knox Martin, Robert Rauschenberg, Sigmund Abeles and Susan Weil. He married fellow artist Martha Ryther (1896–1981). He taught at the League from 1936 to 1972, until his illness prevented him from continuing to teach.

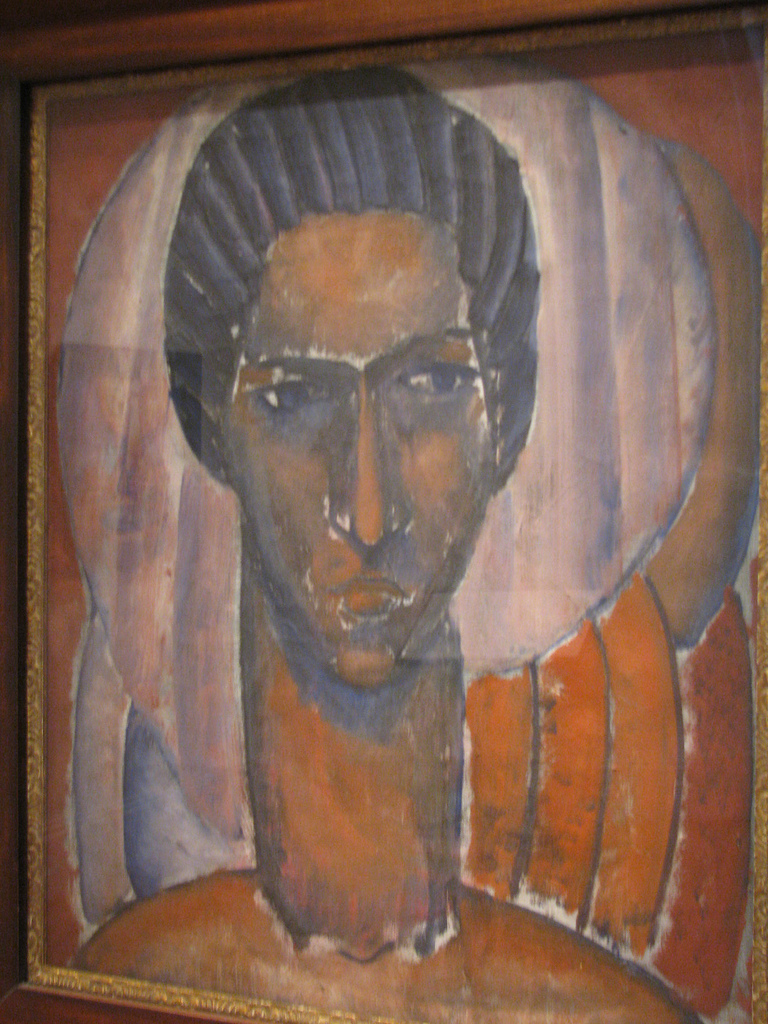
Self Portrait

In addition to his downtown Manhattan studio adjacent to Union Square, he also maintained a studio on Cape Cod in Wellfleet, Massachusetts. Like many American artists, in the 1920s he also spent time working in Paris, where his circle included sculptor Isamu Noguchi among others. The 1930s found him in the position of supervisor of the Federal Art Project's Easel Painting Project in Rockland County, New York. In the 1940s some of his summers were spent in Monhegan, Maine. In the 1960s, Kantor exhibited his work at the Bertha Schaefer Gallery, New York City. He was active in sketching and drawing through the early 1970s, until shortly before his death. He died at the age of 77, after a two-year illness.

Kantor's work is on display in many museums, including the Smithsonian American Art Museum, Whitney Museum, Metropolitan Museum of Art, Museum of Modern Art, Art Institute of Chicago, Pennsylvania Academy of the Fine Arts, and Hirshhorn Museum.

== Awards and honors ==
Logan Medal of the Art Institute of Chicago, 1931

Temple Medal of the University of Illinois, 1951
