= Baseball At Night =

1934 painting by Morris Kantor

Baseball at Night
- Artist: Morris Kantor
- Year: 1934
- Medium: Oil on linen
- Movement: American Realism
- Subject: Nighttime baseball game
- Dimensions: 37 × 47 1/4 in. (94.0 × 120.0 cm.)
- Location: American Art Museum, Washington, D.C.
- Owner: Smithsonian

Baseball at Night is a 1934 oil painting by the artist Morris Kantor. The artist had taken in a night game held at the Clarkstown Country Club in West Nyack, New York, which was then a rare novelty.
