= Joseph Fiore =

American painter

- Born: February 3, 1925
- Died: September 18, 2008 (aged 83)
- Education: Black Mountain College
- Occupation: Painter
- Spouse(s): Anne Furman Banks (1948–1952); Mary Falconer Fitton (1952–2008)
- Children: Thomas and Susanna Fiore

Joseph Fiore (1925–2008) was an American painter. He was involved with Black Mountain College from 1946 to 1957, first as a student and later as a member of the faculty.

== Life ==
Fiore was born in Cleveland, Ohio. Fiore's father was a violinist and founding member of the Cleveland Symphony.

Fiore was conscripted as an infantryman and served in Northern France during World War II. He went to North Carolina in the summer of 1946 to study at Black Mountain College, where he was associated with faculty members Ilya Bolotowsky, who taught painting, and Charlotte Schlesinger, the piano instructor. While he primarily emphasized painting, music was a strong secondary interest. Fiore sang in the school's chorus and took a musical composition from John Cage during the 1948 Summer Institute.

During his time as a student at Black Mountain College, Fiore also met and married Anne Furman Banks, another pupil at the school. In the fall of 1948, the two briefly left Black Mountain for the West Coast, where Fiore studied at the San Francisco Art Institute. By the summer of 1949, the two were back in North Carolina, in part due to an illness requiring his wife to be hospitalized in Asheville. Fiore was appointed a faculty member in 1949 as well, chosen by Pete Jennerjahn to replace outgoing faculty member Josef Albers. In the summer of 1950, Fiore met and fell in love with another student, Mary Falconer Fitton. The two were married discreetly in 1952. Their life at Black Mountain College was dramatically marked by a fire in 1953, which destroyed most of the Fiores' worldly goods and a large amount of finished work. The artist remained at Black Mountain College as a faculty member until the school's closure in 1957.

Fiore's final departure from Black Mountain brought him to New York City. His first significant show there was a two-man exhibition with fellow Black Mountain College alumnus and sculptor John Chamberlain at Davida Gallery in 1958. In 1959, Fiore and Mary began to live and paint seasonally in Jefferson, Maine, subsequently purchasing a 40-acre farm in Jefferson, Maine. His paintings were inspired by the beauty of Maine and its landscapes. He and his wife made many charitable contributions to land preservation and farming in Maine. He was a prominent artist among others such as Louise Nevelson, William Zurich and others who were important in the early years of the Maine Art Gallery in Wiscasset.

He died at his home in New York City in 2008, survived by his wife Mary and children Thomas and Susanna.

== Work ==
Fiore created abstract oil paintings and collages. His work was frequently inspired by the natural world. The vast majority of works Fiore created at Black Mountain College were lost to a fire on campus in 1953. However, some of his colorful collages were spared. James Thompson described Fiore's long artistic career as dividing into three periods:

"The first, which began with his work at Black Mountain College, includes an exploration of modernism under Bolotowsky that started with a study of European masters like Picasso, Braque, and Klee and continued with America's first major school, the Abstract Expressionists. [...] During the second major period of his art Fiore applied his knowledge of non-figurative composition to natural motifs: he became a landscape painter in a much more obvious and traditional sense. [...] The third period of Fiore's art includes works inspired by ethnic carved and painted rock decorations."
