= Susan Weil =

American artist (born 1930)

- Born: March 31, 1930 (age 95); New York City, US
- Education: Académie Julian; Black Mountain College; Art Students League of New York
- Known for: 3D Painting
- Awards: Guggenheim Fellowship, National Endowment for the Arts

Susan Weil (born March 31, 1930) is an American artist best known for her experimental three-dimensional paintings that combine figurative illustration with explorations of movement and space.

== Life and career ==
Weil was born in New York City. In the late 1940s she was involved in a relationship with Robert Rauschenberg. The two met while attending the Académie Julian in Paris, and in 1948 both attended Black Mountain College in North Carolina to study under Josef Albers. In 1949 Weil introduced Rauschenberg to a technique for making cyanotypes, also known as blueprints, which she had learned in childhood, and they collaborated on a number of these works over a period of several years. One such piece, Blue Print Photogram For Mural Decoration was included in the 1951 exhibition "Abstraction in Photography" organized by Edward Steichen for the Museum of Modern Art in New York.

On April 9, 1951 a three-page article in Life magazine titled "Speaking of Pictures" appeared, with photographs by Wallace Kirkland documenting Rauschenberg and Weil making blueprints, many of which no longer exist. At the Art Students League of New York Susan Weil studied with Vaclav Vytlacil and Morris Kantor. Robert Rauschenberg and Susan Weil were married in the summer of 1950 at the Weil family home in Outer Island, Connecticut. Their son, Christopher Rauschenberg was born on July 16, 1951. The two separated in June 1952 and divorced in 1953.

In 1957, Weil commissioned Bernard Kirschenbaum to create a geodesic dome as an artist studio in Stony Creek, Connecticut. The two married in 1958 and had a daughter, Sara Kirschenbaum, in 1959.

Weil was part of the first group of artists in residence in 1976 at the Institute for Art and Urban Resources Inc., led by Alanna Heiss, now MoMA PS1. Her work was included in the premiere exhibition Rooms in 1976.

In addition to creating painting and mixed media work, Weil has experimented with bookmaking and has produced several limited edition artist books with Vincent FitzGerald & Co. since 1985. During a period of eleven years Weil experimented with etchings and handmade paper while also keeping a daily notebook of drawings inspired by the writings of James Joyce. Her exhibition, Ear's Eye for James Joyce, was presented at Sundaram Tagore gallery in New York in 2003.

Since 2000, she has collaborated with photographer José Betancourt on a series of blueprints.

In 2015, Susan Weil's work was included in the exhibition Frontiers Reimagined, a collateral event of the 56th Venice Biennale. Other notable recent exhibitions include Leap Before You Look: Black Mountain College 1933-1957, which premiered in 2015 at Black Mountain College Museum + Arts Center in Asheville, North Carolina and traveled to the Hammer Museum, Los Angeles and the Wexner Center for the Arts at Ohio State University, Columbus.

Weil's work is in many major museum collections, including the Metropolitan Museum of Art, Museum of Modern Art, the Victoria and Albert Museum, and the J. Paul Getty Museum.

Her work has been shown in major solo exhibitions in the United States and Europe, notably at Black Mountain College Museum + Arts Center in Asheville, North Carolina, and the Museo Reina Sofia in Madrid, though museums in her home state of New York have yet to organize a comprehensive retrospective of her work.

She continues to live and work in New York City.

== Awards ==
Weil has been the recipient of the prestigious Guggenheim Fellowship and awards from the National Endowment for the Arts.
