= Al Held =

American painter (1928 - 2005)

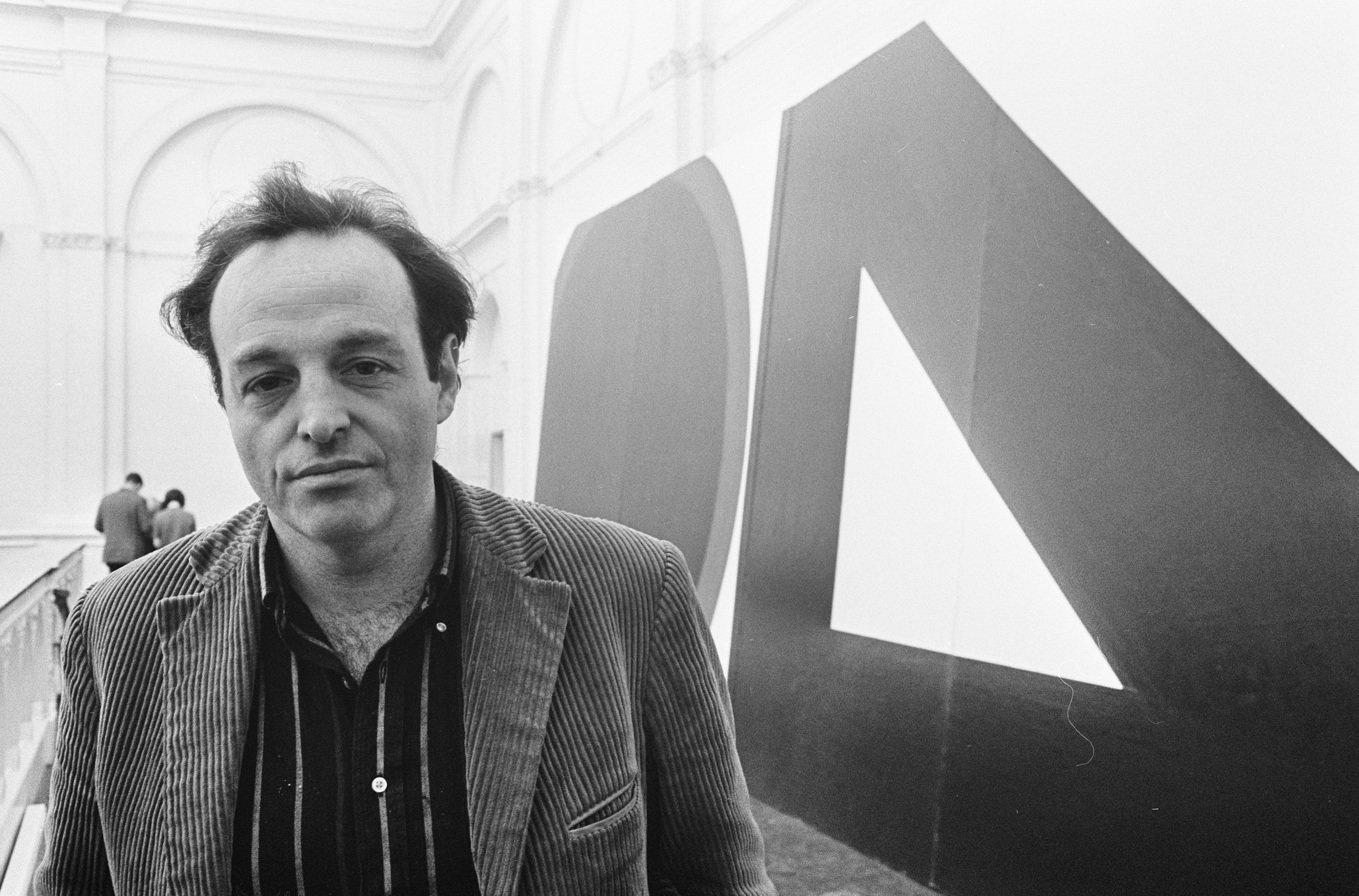
- Al Held at the Stedelijk Museum in Amsterdam in 1966
- Born: October 12, 1928; Brooklyn, New York, U.S.
- Died: July 27, 2005 (aged 76) near Todi, Italy
- Education: Art Students League of New York, Académie de la Grande Chaumière
- Style: Geometric abstraction Hard-edge painting
- Movement: Abstract expressionism
- Spouse(s): Sylvia Stone; Yvonne Rainer; Giselle Wexler; Kathleen Monaghan
- Awards: Logan Medal of the Arts

Al Held (October 12, 1928 – July 27, 2005) was an American Abstract expressionist painter. He was particularly well known for his large scale Hard-edge paintings. As an artist, multiple stylistic changes occurred throughout his career, however, none of these occurred at the same time as any popular emerging style or acted against a particular art form. In the 1950s his style reflected the abstract expressionist tone and then transitioned to a geometric style in the 1960s. During the 1980s, there was a shift into painting that emphasized bright geometric space the deepness of which reflected infinity. From 1963 to 1980 he was a professor of art at Yale University.

== Background and education ==
Born in Brooklyn, New York, in 1928, he grew up in the East Bronx, the son of a poor Jewish family thrown onto welfare during the depression. Held showed no interest in art until leaving the Navy in 1947. Inspired by his friend Nicholas Krushenick, Held enrolled in the Art Students League of New York. He originally thought about studying in Mexico under the prominent muralist David Siqueiros, who created gigantic pieces that contained intense political material. However, the G.I. accreditation that he planned on using to help with his travels was not accepted at the school he planned on attending. In 1951, using the support of the G.I. Bill, he went to Paris for two years, to study at the Académie de la Grande Chaumière. In Paris, he decided that realism was not for him and moved into abstraction. During the early 1950s Avant-garde painters in the United States were receiving fresh inspiration from abstract expressionists such as Jackson Pollock, Mark Rothko, and Willem de Kooning. Together these artists brought a new way of thinking that influenced Held. He returned to New York in 1953.

== Career ==
The Galerie Huit in Paris was where his first exhibition was set up in 1952. However, the art scene in New York was starting to gain new popularity and Held moved back there. During one of his solo Abstract expressionist exhibitions in 1959, Held's large-scale paintings of colourful, simple abstract geometric forms gained increasing recognition in America and Europe. In 1962, he was appointed to the faculty of Yale School of Art (where he would teach until 1980). In 1965, the critic Irving Sandler curated the critically acclaimed Concrete Expressionism show at New York University featuring the work of painters Al Held and Knox Martin and the sculptors Ronald Bladen, George Sugarman and David Weinrib.

In 1964, Held was awarded the Logan Medal of the Arts and received a Guggenheim Fellowship in 1966. Feeling that he'd reached the end of his style's potential, he shifted in 1967 to black and white images that dealt with challenging perspectives and "spatial conundrums". Some critics dismissed this work as simply disorienting; others declared it Held's finest achievement to date. By the late 1970s, he had re-introduced color to his work. In 1988 he was elected into the National Academy of Design as an Associate member, and became a full Academician in 1994.

In his later years, Held earned commissions of up to one million dollars. In 2005, he completed a large, colourful mural in the New York City Subway system, at Lexington Avenue / 51st – 53rd Streets station.

Three of Held's murals were in the original WTC 7 building.

At age 76, Held was found dead in his villa swimming pool near Camerata, Italy, on July 27, 2005. It is believed he died of natural causes.

== Work ==
=== Pigment paintings ===
The most distinguishing part of Held's pigment paintings were the thick brush strokes of paint in random directions that are reminiscent of Abstract Expressionism. These strokes were short, gestural and are commonly referred to as action painting. The colors included earth tones that are muted and spread around chaotically. Typical for many of these paintings was no foreground or background and sections were splashed with drips. As time went forward in the fifties, Held began to lengthen his gestures and combined strokes into triangles, circles, and rectangles. This was alluding to the geometric abstractions that started at the end of 1959.

=== Hard edge paintings ===
Untitled by Al Held, 1964, Honolulu Museum of Art

During the late 1950s, gestural painting was something that Held had begun to lose interest in. He and a few other artists such as Morris Louis and Kenneth Noland felt a growing problem emerge. The style had brought a large number of mediocre artists and become overdone for them. By 1960 he had succeeded in finding an alternative method given the label hard edge. In other ways it has been described as post-painterly abstraction, new abstraction, and cool art. The famous exhibition organizer Irving Sandler has been known to characterize it as concrete expressionism. The development of this style also led Held to change his medium from oil to a water-based acrylic. These paintings had vivid colors geometric configurations around positioned throughout the canvas resembling a mural. All of the paintings were nonobjective meaning the artwork does not represent a person, place or thing. Untitled from 1964, in the collection of the Honolulu Museum of Art is an example of the artist's hard-edge style.

=== Alphabet paintings ===
With these works Held takes concrete abstraction to its extreme. Around 1961–1966 Held created large abstract letters of the English alphabet. These paintings were given the titles The Big ‘N', The Big ‘X’, etc. There is a delicate alteration of the letters as Held plays with viewers perception's by changing the figure to the frame. The letters themselves take over the canvas and colors within the works make them seem to lean forward and backward at the same time. It leaves the viewer to think about the ideas of space and form and how dimension plays a key role.

=== Geometric abstraction ===
In 1967 Held felt that he was being limited by the flatness of previous hard edge abstractions. He wanted a way to create more picture space in some way, however painting shapes onto shapes would constantly hide beneath one another. Therefore, Held believed that adding depth and making the shapes appear three-dimensional on the canvas was his best option. The works Giza Gate II and Flemish IV are good examples of this style. A representative black-and-white mural of volumetric forms in space, Rothko's Canvas, was commissioned for The Governor Nelson A. Rockefeller Empire State Plaza Art Collection in Albany, NY.

B/W XII (1968) at The Phillips Collection in 2023

All of these works are composed in acrylic black and white. The quasi-geometric structures zigzag in all directions making complex shapes usually cubical. Despite the same consistency of content throughout the works each maintain a unique design of their own. Grid like elements started becoming more apparent suggesting structure similar to that of the framework in buildings. The paintings are in a way disorienting with their uncentered patterns and no place to gain perspective. As his art's complexity grew the idea of his art to be deemed minimalistic became less of a dominant label. Another remarkable characteristic of these works is the scale. For example, in Philadelphia during 1976 he painted his two largest murals, Order/Disorder and Ascension/Descension. Each mural was 13 x 90 feet and stretches throughout an office building.

The Pérez Art Museum Miami, holds an example of Held's geometric abstraction series titled Solar Wind I, produced between 1973-74.

=== Watercolors ===
While Held was away from his studio in New York during the 1980s, he created a number of watercolor paintings in Rome. The perspective of the shapes created a sense of deep space by expanding into the canvas what seems like forever. These works test imagination with intersecting planes and large to small forms jutting in the picture. Held's visual concept of infinity creates a need for the viewer to look inward on themself. Works such as Pachinko make viewers ask questions to understand how huge the structures actually are in relation to one another in the painting and this leads to more questions. The understanding of the forms is dynamic as certain objects could be large and far away or small and near the foreground. The perception of space challenges the audience to see the problem of observing the area around them.

=== Contemporary works ===
Much of Held's modern artwork includes large symmetric non-objective structures with vivid colors. Using an acrylic medium, he created interlocking scaffolds that overlap with a deep consideration of architecture. The ancient buildings of Rome and the idea of the renaissance inspired Held as he returned to New York. Describing Held's images as "room" or "walls" makes sense, however, the art is non-objective and those may not be the best words to use. On one hand the work has architectural qualities but at the same time the planes of color are nonrepresentational and in a way cannot be grasped.

In 1983, his 15’ by 55’ mural Mantegna’s Edge was completed in Dallas, Texas. The work is less fragmented and a deeper sense of order compared to some of his other works. Bright colored, grid-like structure exists harmonically in an infinite blue space. Yet, existing within it also is a sense of paradox and complexity.

== Art market ==
Held's estate has been represented by White Cube since 2018.

== Personal life ==
Held married Giselle Wexler in 1953, with whom he had a daughter, Mara. After the break-up with his wife, he went to San Francisco where he met the soon-to-be postmodern dancer and choreographer Yvonne Rainer. They moved together to New York in 1956, got married in 1957 to split up in 1959. Then in 1969, he married the sculptor, Sylvia Stone.. He later married art historian and museum director, Kathleen Monaghan.

== See also ==
- Abstract expressionism
- Art Students League of New York
