= Karl Martz =

American ceramic artist and professor (b. 1912, d. 1997)

- Born: June 24, 1912; Columbus, Ohio
- Died: May 27, 1997 (aged 84); Bloomington, Indiana
- Known for: Ceramic Art and Professor, School of Fine Arts, Indiana University, Bloomington
- Spouse: Margaret Rebekah "Becky" Brown
- Website: martzpots.org

Karl Martz (June 24, 1912 – May 27, 1997) was an American studio potter, ceramic artist, and teacher whose work achieved national and international recognition.

== Born ==
Karl Martz was born in 1912 at Columbus, Ohio, USA to Velorus Martz , a high school principal and later Professor of Education at Indiana University, and Amy Lee Kidwell Martz

"While I was in high school [1925-29], the whole family took a motor trip through the West. The car got into the sand in New Mexico and ripped out its differential, and we were stuck waiting for its replacement. So we put up our tent and stayed a couple of weeks. I entertained myself in part by making little pots and firing them in a pit -- I'd read the Indians did this. I still have one of them."

== Education ==
Martz graduated from Indiana University in 1933 with a bachelor's degree in Chemistry.

== Career ==
=== Beginnings ===
Martz's first exposure to a professional ceramic art studio was in 1931 when he attended a summer course at Ohio State University. For the summer of 1932, Griffith Pottery in Nashville, Brown County, Indiana (a tourist destination and artist's colony) hired Martz to improve their glaze formulas. In 1933, Martz graduated from Indiana University, Bloomington, with a bachelor's degree in chemistry. He worked again at Griffith Pottery in the summer of 1933. In 1933-34, Martz returned to Ohio State University to do graduate work in ceramic art with Arthur E. Baggs, Carlton Atherton, and Edgar Littlefield. He worked as an apprentice at Brown County Pottery for a year. In 1935, he began a series of rustic studios in the woods near Nashville, Indiana.

=== Pre-War Studio ===
Around 1936, Martz was discovered by his subsequent patron, Scott Murphy, an art collector who had a summer home in Nashville, Indiana. Murphy funded Martz to move his studio from its remote location in the woods to downtown Nashville, where many more tourists would encounter his work. Murphy also funded a new showroom.

During the period from 1935 to 1942, Martz was enormously productive, making colorful earthenware. Looking back decades later, Martz's wife Becky called this period "the golden years". In 1936 and 1937, his work was exhibited in the National Ceramic Exhibition in Syracuse, New York, and included in the exhibit circuit. This was the first of widespread recognition he achieved during the remainder of his life. Nationally syndicated journalist, Ernie Pyle, described Martz in 1940 as follows:

Karl Martz is reticent, low-spoken, gratefully polite. He does not speak in arty terms. ... The parlor of his home is the exhibition room. In it today stand the most beautiful pieces of pottery I have ever seen. Each piece is an individual thing, almost with a soul. He never makes a duplicate of anything. ... The ingenuity and artistry that he fashions into his clay are actually touching.

=== Wartime ===
By 1942, tourist traffic in Brown County, Indiana, had largely ceased due to World War II gas rationing. For the remainder of the war, Martz did research in ceramics at Carnegie-Illinois Steel Company and Armour Research Foundation in Chicago, Illinois. In 1944, he taught ceramic art part-time at the Chicago Institute of Design directed by László Moholy-Nagy, and at Hull House.

=== Indiana University ===
In the spring of 1945, Martz was hired by Henry Radford Hope. Hope chaired the Fine Arts Department (later the School of Fine Arts) at Indiana University from 1941 to 1968. Martz began as an instructor of ceramic art. Ceramic equipment was difficult to obtain after the war, so the university bought all the equipment and supplies from Martz's earlier private studio.

Martz achieved national and international recognition over the next four decades, both as an educator and as a ceramic artist. In the 1950s, he began doing sculptural work in stoneware and later, Asian-inspired porcelain, as well as continuing functional and sculptural earthenware. In the fall of 1952, Martz participated in the seminal pottery workshop at Black Mountain College, North Carolina, working with Bernard Leach, Shoji Hamada, and Marguerite Wildenhain among others.

In 1957, Martz and Harvey Littleton spent ten days at the historic Jugtown Pottery near Seagrove, North Carolina, where they learned traditional salt-glazed stoneware techniques. In 1965, he was elected President of the Design Section of the Ceramics Education Council of the American Ceramic Society (ACS).

In 1966, he was a leader in the separation of that group from the ACS and the founding of the National Council on Education for the Ceramic Arts (NCECA).

In 1992, he was inducted as a Fellow of the American Craft Council.

==== Sabbaticals in Japan ====
In fall 1963, Martz did a sabbatical semester in Japan studying mingei methods and visiting many potteries. He worked in Kyoto in the studio of his host, Yuzo Kondo (1902-1985), recognized in 1977 by the Japanese Government as a Living National Treasure. During this sabbatical, he crafted white porcelain pieces with blue decorations in the style of Kondo-sensei.

In 1971-2, Martz did a second sabbatical in Japan, this time headquartered in the studio of his host Hiroshi Seto (1941-1994) in the town of Mashiko, famed for its traditional family potteries. Martz was particularly inspired by the work of Mashiko potter Totaro Sakuma (1900-1976) . While in Mashiko, Martz crafted several pieces in the style of Sakuma-sensei.

== Films ==
Craftsmanship in Clay is a series of six moving pictures (originally 16 mm films, now available in digital format) featuring and scripted by Martz and produced by the (then) Indiana University Audio-Visual Center. The films were produced between 1948 - 1954.

- Simple slab methods (1948, 11 min)
- Glaze application (1949, 11 min)
- Stacking and firing (1950, 11 min)
- Throwing (1950, 11 min)
- Decoration (1952, 11 min)
- Simple molds (1954, 11 min)

In 1975, he appeared in a 25 min film titled Possibilities in Clay, which also featured Thomas Marsh, Ginny Marsh, Kathy Salchow, and John Goodheart.

== Recognition ==
Awards
Year	Awards	Awarded By	Ref
1989	Distinguished Hoosier	Robert D. Orr, Indiana Governor	

In 1965, Martz was elected as the president of the Ceramics Education Council of the American Ceramic Society (ACS). As the president, he was a leader in the separation of that group from the ACS and the founding of the National Council on Education in the Ceramic Arts (NCECA) in 1966.

In 1974, Martz was appointed the Bingham Professor of the Humanities at the University of Louisville, Kentucky. In 1977, there was a major retrospective exhibit at the Indiana University Art Museum on the occasion of Martz's retirement. In 1992, he was inducted as a fellow of the American Craft Council.

=== Posthumous Recognition ===
In 2009, Kathy M. McKimmie wrote Clay Times Three which includes 38 pages illustrated in color about the lives and ceramics of Karl Martz and his wife Becky Brown Martz. In 2019, the Haan Museum of Indiana Art mounted the exhibition Karl Martz and the Legacy of Indiana Ceramics.

=== Works in Museums ===
Examples of his work are (or were) in the permanent collections of the Smithsonian Institution in Washington DC , the Museum of Modern Art in Tokyo , the Museum of Decorative Arts in Lisbon, the Museum of Contemporary Crafts in New York , the Walker Art Center in Minneapolis , the IBM Corporation, the Everson Museum of Art in Syracuse New York , the Minnesota Museum of Art in St. Paul, the Sheldon Museum of Art at the University of Nebraska , and several museums in Indiana including the Midwest Museum of American Art , the Haan Museum of Indiana Art , the Indiana University (now Eskenazi) Art Museum , and the Indianapolis Museum of Art .

== Personal life ==
In 1935, he married Margaret Rebekah "Becky" Brown . Initially, they lived in a small cabin on a hill just south of Nashville, Indiana, where Martz built his first kiln:

"I built a kiln out in the woods. Didn't know a thing about building kilns, of course. I got a big 20 gallon stoneware crock, knocked the bottom out to get a draft, and put a pan underneath to drip oil into so the flame would come up through. Can you believe this? It smoked terribly -- great clouds -- and the neighbors thought we were running a moonshine still. But I could get copper reds on the bottom and chrome reds on top, all in the same firing. Pretty soon I talked my dad into financing a real kiln."

Soon they rented a cabin in the woods, North of Nashville, Indiana. They had two sons, Eric in 1940, and Brian in 1942. Becky learned ceramics from her husband, initially making small items to sell to tourists. Later, Becky developed her own style, making charming and whimsical animal sculptures, and earning a regional reputation .

Martz designed a home and studio on the outskirts of Nashville, Indiana, the "Martz Studio", . and built it largely with his own hands, starting in 1949. In 1954, the family took up academic-year residence in Bloomington, Indiana, to enable their two boys to attend the University School, which was academically much superior to the school in Nashville IN. Eric became a professor of biological science, and Brian, a musician and professor of music. Martz and his wife continued to spend weekends and summers at the Nashville Martz Studio, making and selling pottery there, until 1961, when they sold it and moved to a modest home at 105 N. Overhill Dr. in Bloomington, Indiana, where their lives had become centered . They converted the attached garage into a ceramics studio, where Martz and his wife continued to make pottery and ceramic sculpture until precluded by failing health .

=== Personality ===
Martz had an unassuming and modest demeanor, preferring to be called a potter. He battled lifelong depression. In the late 1930s and early 1940s, he enjoyed acting in plays (some written or directed by Joseph Hayes) at the Brown County Theater. He played the piano, mostly boogie woogie, sometimes entertaining his children and nieces with musically-accompanied stories.

== Death ==
In his final years, Martz battled metastatic prostate cancer, became nearly blind due to macular degeneration, and also suffered significant hearing loss. Shortly before his 85th birthday, unable to recover from gall bladder surgery, he died from natural causes on 27 May 1997.

== See also ==
- List of studio potters
- Studio pottery
