= Basil King (painter and poet) =

American painter (born 1935)

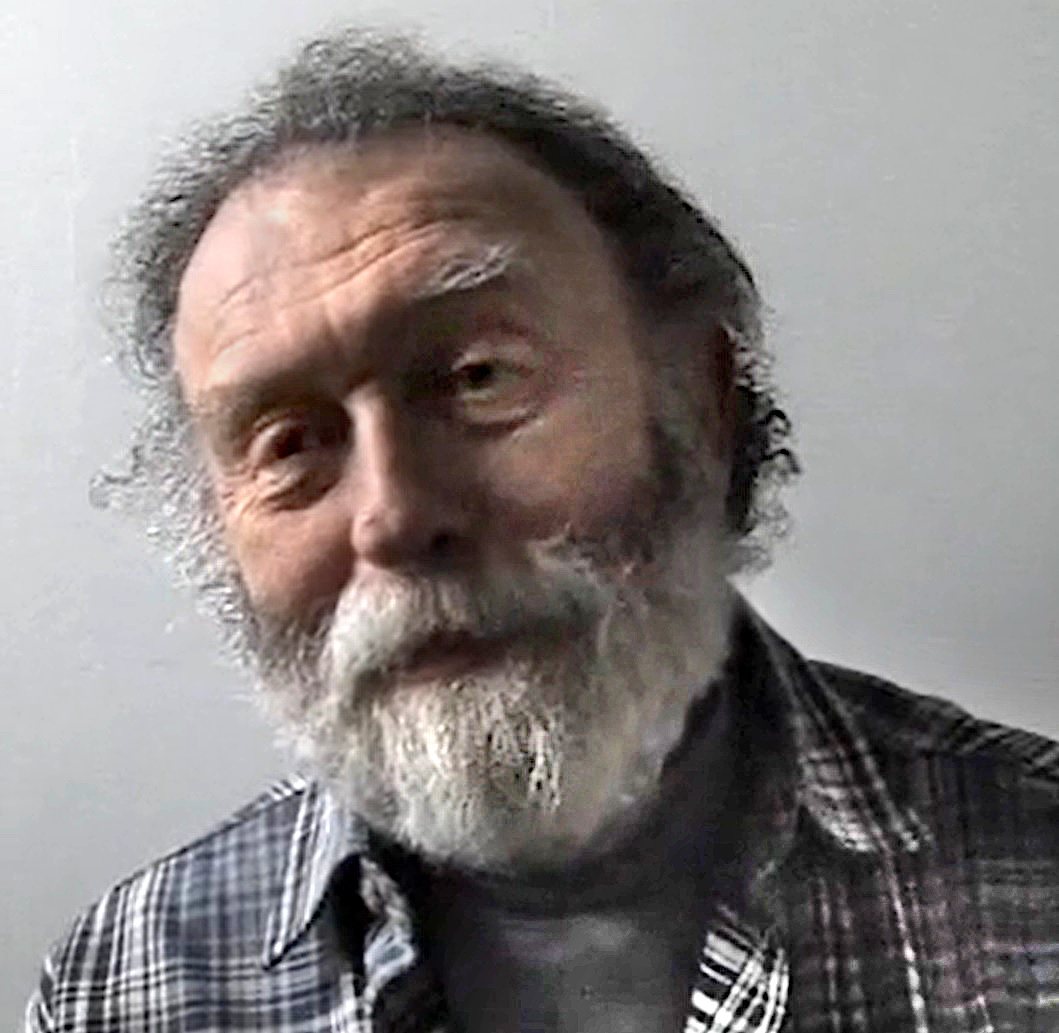
- King in 2012
- Born: May 30, 1935 (age 91); London, U.K.
- Website: http://www.basilking.net

Basil King (born May 30, 1935) is an American painter and writer, associated with Black Mountain College, where he was a student as a teenager.

== Biography and education ==
Born Basil Herschel Cohen in London in 1935, he came to the United States with his parents in 1947, at which time the family name was changed from Cohen to King.

In 1951, at the age of 16, King was admitted to Black Mountain College, where he studied with Esteban Vicente, Joseph Fiore, Charles Olson, Robert Duncan and Robert Creeley, among others. From 1960 to 1964 King worked as a studio assistant for Adolph Gottlieb, Mark Rothko, and Barnett Newman in New York City.

Since 1959, he has lived in New York, and since 1968 in Brooklyn, where he paints, writes, and works collaboratively with poets providing art for small press publications.

== Literary work ==
=== Learning to Draw, A History ===
Throughout his career, King has been at work on an epic-length hybrid poetry/prose work entitled Learning To Draw/A History. This work merges autobiographical history and anecdotes with sections on figures from literary and art history important to King's development as an artist. Sections of the work have been published in except by various publishers in both chapbook and perfect-bound form.

=== Other works ===
King has published discrete poems and books outside of the Learning to Draw/A History project. King has illustrated over 40 different published poetry books.

== Personal life ==
Basil King is married to the writer Martha Winston King and they have two children.

== Exhibitions ==
=== Solo exhibitions ===
In 1973, King received his first solo exhibition at the Grand Rapids Art Museum; this was followed in 1974 with "Visions of a Great Rememberer: Basil King and Allen Ginsberg," an exhibition of ballpoint pen drawings on music paper that he did for Allen Ginsberg's "Visions of the Great Rememberer" at the Museum of Art, University of Kansas. Since then, King has had eight solo shows, including: Kirkland Art Center, The Poetry Project at St. Marks, Granary Books Gallery, The Bowery Poetry Club and, most recently, Poet's House in 2010.

=== Group exhibitions ===
Since the 1980s, King has been featured in fourteen group exhibits focusing on Black Mountain College, including the Edith Bum Center at Bard College, El Museo Nacional Centre de Arte Reina Sophia, The Hickory Museum of Art and the Brooklyn Academy of Music.

== Collections ==
King's work can be found in many collections throughout the United States, including: Yale University, Wadsworth Athenaeum, Grand Valley State Colleges, University of Kansas Museum of Art, State University of New York at Buffalo, Spencer Collection at The New York Public Library, Gladstone Museum of Baseball Art, North Carolina Museum of Art, Springfield (Massachusetts) Museum of Art, Black Mountain College Museum & Art Center, Poets House, and the Asheville Art Museum.

== Other media ==
King is the subject of “Basil King: MIRAGE” a 22-minute film by Nicole Peyrafitte and Miles Joris-Peyrafitte, which premiered at Anthology Film Archives in New York City September 22, 2012.

== Bibliography ==
=== Full-length collections ===
2020 – Disparate Beasts: Basil King's Beastiary, Part Two, New York: Marsh Hawk Press
2017 – History Now, New York: Marsh Hawk Press
2014 – The Spoken Word/The Painted Hand from Learning to Draw/A History, 104 pages. New York: Marsh Hawk Press
2011 – Learning to Draw/A History, 270 pages, with cover and frontispiece. Cheltenham, UK: Skylight Press
2007 – 77 Beasts: Basil King’s Beastiary, 176 pages, New York: Marsh Hawk Press
2003 – Mirage: A Poem in 22 Sections, 160 pages. New York: Marsh Hawk Press
2001 – Warp Spasm, 116 pages. New York: Spuyten Duyvill
2000 – The Poet, 228 pages. New York: Spuyten Duyvil
1997 – Devotions with Selections from A Painter’s Bestiary, 74 pages. England: Stop Press

== Teaching and editorial activity ==
King founded and edited the magazine, Mulch (1970–76) and Mulch Press Books (1972–77). King also taught as an art instructor for most of his career at a variety of colleges including: Cooper Union, Fordham University and Rutgers University.
