= Hazel Larsen Archer =

American photographer (1921–2001)

- Born: Hazel Frieda Larsen; April 23, 1921; Milwaukee, Wisconsin, United States
- Died: May 18, 2001 (aged 80); Tucson, Arizona
- Education: Black Mountain College
- Known for: Photography, design

Hazel Frieda Archer (née Larsen; April 23, 1921, Milwaukee, Wisconsin – May 18, 2001, Tucson, Arizona) was a twentieth-century American female photographer who attended and then taught at Black Mountain College. Her images and prints captured life at Black Mountain, and her art theory and teaching influenced major 20th-century artists and personalities.

== Life and work ==
Archer was born Hazel Frieda Larsen on April 23, 1921. She grew up with two brothers and a sister. Larsen contracted polio at age 10 spent 3 years in hospital before going to high school. She used braces and crutches while in high school.

In the spring of 1944, while at the University of Wisconsin, she saw a notice that German artist Josef Albers was offering summer courses in design and painting at Black Mountain College in North Carolina. It was the beginning of her long association with the experimental liberal arts college. After getting her degree at Wisconsin, she returned to Black Mountain College, where she was a student, teacher and registrar for the next nine years.

Archer matriculated into Black Mountain College in the summer of 1944 and returned in 1945 to study with Albers. During her years at Black Mountain College she also studied with Buckminster Fuller, Robert Motherwell, Walter Gropius, and the photographers Beaumont Newhall and Nancy Newhall. After graduation, she joined the faculty, and became the school’s first full-time teacher of photography in 1949. She taught many significant students at the college, including Robert Rauschenberg, Cy Twombly, and Stan VanDerBeek. Archer photographed life at the college and captured the everyday moments of the school's famous teachers and students.

Archer met her husband Charles while at Black College. She operated a free-lance photography studio in Tucson, Arizona. In 1963, she became director of adult education of the Tucson Art Center, an organization that would become the Tucson Museum of Art. She lived in Tucson until 1975, when she moved to Santa Fe, New Mexico. Though her work had been shown at the Museum of Modern Art and the Photo League in New York, she stopped exhibiting after 1957; she focused for the rest of her life on her work as an educator.

== Death and legacy ==
Archer died in Tucson, Arizona, aged 80, on May 18, 2001. Her photographs are managed by the Hazel Larsen Archer Estate and Black Mountain College Museum + Arts Center.

In 2023 the Center For Creative Photography held a major exhibition of Hazel's Archer's work in conjunction with the first major retrospective of the work of her student Linda McCartney.

== Sources ==
- Vaughan, David (2006). Hazel Larsen Archer: Black Mountain College Photographer. Asheville, North Carolina: Black Mountain Press.
- The Associated Press (June 4, 2001). Santa Fe artist, teacher dies at 80. Amarillo, Texas: Amarillo Globe News.
- Cunningham, Merce (2005). Motion Studies: Hazel Larsen Archer at Black Mountain College. New York: Aperture.
