= Warren MacKenzie =

American craft potter (1924 – 2018)

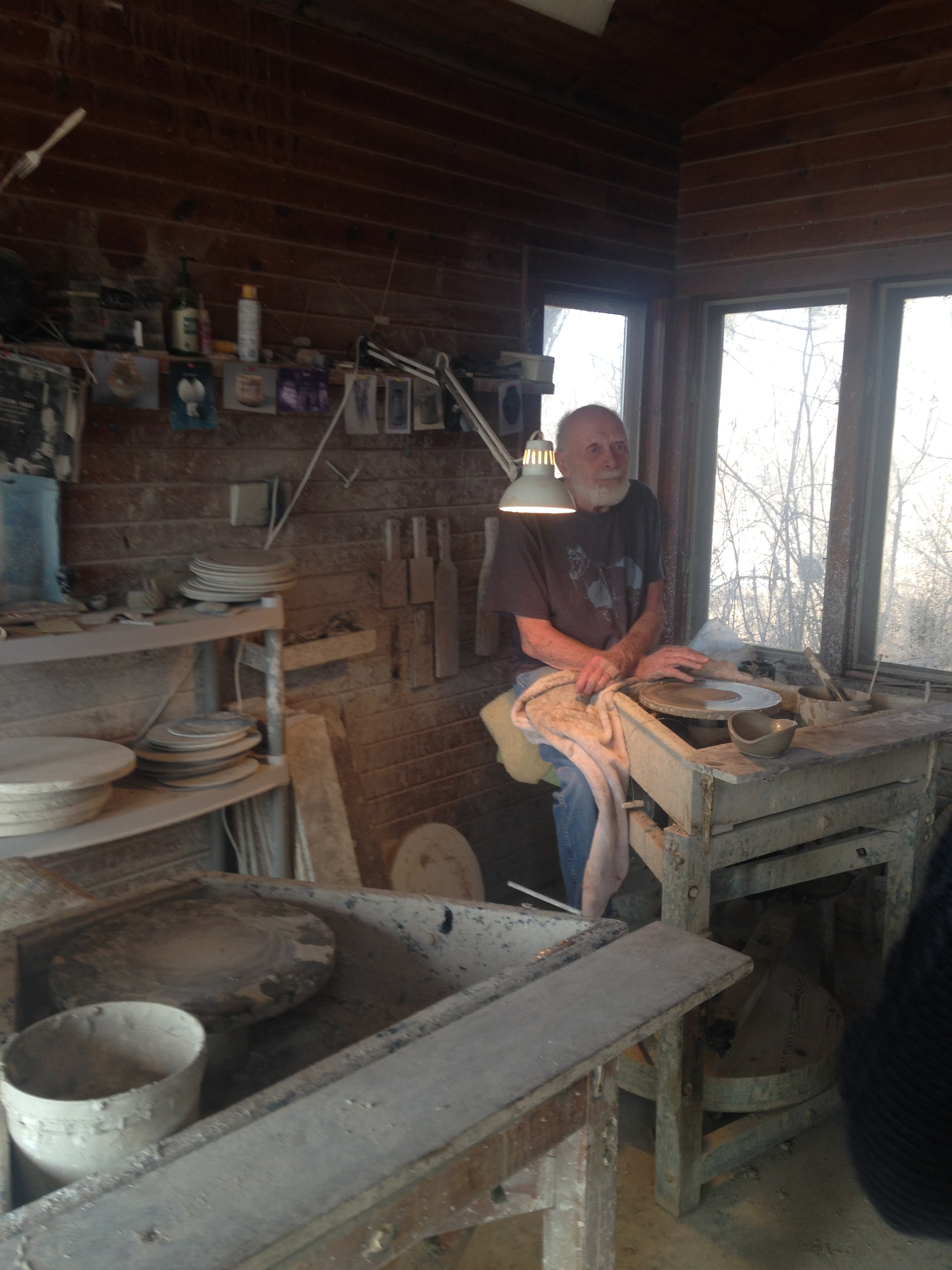
Warren Mackenzie demonstrating to potters in his studio in Grant, Minnesota, in February 2017

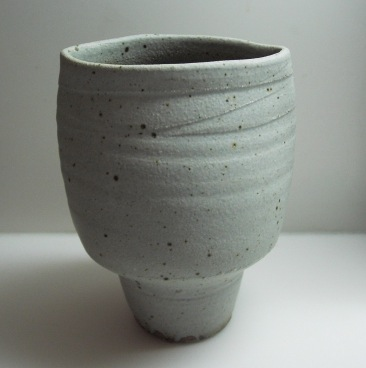
A vase by Warren MacKenzie

Warren MacKenzie (February 16, 1924 – December 31, 2018) was an American craft potter and is often referred to as the "master" or "father" of the American ceramic art in the mingei tradition. He was also a strong believer in utilitarian pottery and, despite being able to fetch higher prices in galleries, priced his pieces accessibly in his own self-service showroom so people would feel they could use his works.

== Biography ==
=== Early years and education ===
In 1924, Warren MacKenzie was born in Kansas City, Missouri to Fred and Adelaide MacKenzie. The family subsequently moved to Wilmette, Illinois where MacKenzie grew up and later graduated from New Trier High School in nearby Winnetka.

MacKenzie was interested in art from a young age and initially thought he would become a painter — to the extent that, when he enrolled as a student at the School of the Art Institute of Chicago, he initially began taking painting and drawing classes.

In 1943, while studying at the Institute, MacKenzie was drafted into the army. After three years, he returned to continue his studies but the painting classes were all full "because of all the returned GIs [the GI Bill]." MacKenzie took another look at the course catalog and decided to enroll in a ceramics class along with some drawing classes. MacKenzie would later realize that "that the ceramic class was not really a very good class," but a turning point came when "about halfway through the year, one of the students discovered a book by Bernard Leach called A Potters Book and came into the class very excited."

MacKenzie would later identify two teachers as standouts during his tenure at the Institute: Kathleen Blackshear whose "discussion group" teaching style provided a "tremendous learning experience," and Robert von Neumann who "never worked on your painting, never touched your painting but talked extensively about what you were trying to do." Both teachers, MacKenzie later recalled, "never directed you in a single direction, but they just encouraged you to think for yourself."

While studying at the Institute, MacKenzie met his first wife, Alixandra "Alix" Kolesky, a fellow student in the ceramics program. Like MacKenzie, Kolesky had originally started out as a painter but switched her focus to ceramics. Following Kolesky's 1947 graduation, the two married. After MacKenzie graduated the following year, in 1948, the couple were hired to "help set up and direct" St. Paul Gallery and School of Art in Minnesota. MacKenzie later related: "we very quickly found out we were not equipped either to teach or to run our own pottery, and so we decided that we had to have further training."

Their desire for additional training led MacKenzie and Kolesky MacKenzie to Bernard Leach, having been so inspired by his book while studying in Chicago. The MacKenzies traveled to St. Ives, England showed Leach some of their work and asked if they could study with him. He replied that he was "full up," but that the couple could visit daily for the two weeks they had booked at a local bed and breakfast. After the two weeks, Leach relented; the MacKenzies were his first apprentices from America.

The MacKenzies returned to St. Paul and worked for one year, returning to England in 1950 on the same boat as Leach who had just completed a speaking tour in the States. From 1950 to 1952, the couple studied with Leach, learning a lot, while simultaneously realizing that Leach's way of operating was not theirs. MacKenzie would later recall: "we were working from very exact models and dimensions and weights of clay to make these pots which had been designed some 10 or 12 years previous to our arriving there. And we, being, I guess you would say young, arrogant Americans, thought that we ought to be able to somehow express ourselves a little bit more in the daily work of the pottery." He added: "when we left [England] after two and a half years, we went home on a boat again...and Alix turned to me and she said, 'You know, that was a great two years of training, but that's not the way we’re going to run our pottery.' And we never did. That is, we never had a catalogue; we never said we were going to duplicate these pots this year and next year and the year after that and so forth. We did make many pots which were repeated, but we allowed them to change and to grow as we changed and grew, and I think that was the big difference."

While apprenticing with Leach, MacKenzie also participated in the rebuilding of the studio's kiln in 1950. The previous kiln had been built in 1923 or 1924 so, by 1950, it was in pretty bad shape. This experience would later prove helpful when the MacKenzies created their own pottery studio.

MacKenzie participated in the Pottery seminar at Black Mountain College in 1952 in the USA.

=== Return to the United States ===
On their return to the United States, Kolesky MacKenzie stopped teaching in order to care for the couple's first daughter, Tamsyn, who was born in 1953. The couple's second daughter, Shawn, would be born the following year. MacKenzie, meanwhile, stopped teaching at the St. Paul Gallery due to "disagreements with the philosophy of that museum." In the spring of 1953, MacKenzie began teaching ceramics part-time at the University of Minnesota where he taught until his retirement in 1990; students during his tenure included Mark Pharis and Randy Johnston. 1953 also saw the couple purchase a 50-acre farm in Grant, Minnesota just outside of Stillwater — "an old defunct farm," according to MacKenzie. They chose it because it was "dead cheap" but also because it had a new furnace and a recently drilled well, so they knew they could put all the rest of their money "into starting the pottery." They did that in the property's old barn. MacKenzie "spent the summer building the kiln." It was patterned after the one he'd helped build at Leach Pottery, "because it was the only large kiln that I'd ever seen built."

=== Middle years ===
In 1962, tragedy struck; Kolesky MacKenzie died suddenly of cancer. In 1968, ill fortune struck again when MacKenzie's studio burnt to the ground; of the incident, he stated, "I was firing the kiln and evidently broke an oil line or something like that, and the barn was completely destroyed." Fortunately, although the burners, the air blower, oil pump, etc. were destroyed, the kiln was not damaged. Too, the next evening, an architect friend was coming round for dinner and, as MacKenzie recalled, "that evening, with a pad of typing paper and a pencil between the two of us, we designed a three-unit building, which was going to be the new pottery."

=== Later career and life ===
MacKenzie married his second wife, Nancy Spitzer (née Stevens), in 1984; it was also a second marriage for Spitzer who had divorced her first husband. Spitzer was an administrative assistant in the Studio Arts department at the University of Minnesota from 1977 to 1980 and assistant to the dean of the College of Liberal Arts from 1980 to 1993. She was also a textile artist, producing works that would be featured at galleries and museums throughout the Midwest and, internationally, in Japan, Chile and New Zealand.

1984 was also the year that the University of Minnesota made MacKenzie a Regents Professor, "the highest honor the University of Minnesota bestows on its faculty." MacKenzie retired from teaching at the University of Minnesota in 1990, after teaching for 37 years. Upon retirement he became a Regents Professor Emeritus and was subsequently awarded an honorary degree, a doctorate of Humane Letters.

Until December 2006, MacKenzie housed a 24-hour self-service showroom on his property. The showroom operated on the "honor system" which was taken advantage of by people who purchased more than the honor code limit and then resold their purchases online for a profit.

=== Death ===
MacKenzie was predeceased by Nancy, his wife of 30 years, who died of cancer on October 1, 2014, at the age of 80. Warren continued to live in the home they shared - the farm outside Stillwater - maintaining his studio until his death on December 31, 2018, at the age of 94.

== Style, philosophy and technique ==
MacKenzie's simple, wheel-thrown functional pottery was heavily influenced by his time studying with Leach; MacKenzie later recounted: "the first influence was when Alix and I apprenticed at Bernard Leach's pottery in St. Ives, England. Because we stayed in his house, we were around his collection of pots. We saw pots from China and Japan. It is also where we met Shoji Hamada, the master Japanese potter who worked in the mingei tradition. Through Leach and his book, The Potter's Book, pottery became more available. Hamada, who was influenced by Korean folk pottery, took a tradition and gave it new life. I gravitated to his philosophy and how he threw pots." MacKenzie is often credited with bringing the Japanese mingei style of pottery to Minnesota, fondly referred to as the "Mingei-sota style."

In reminiscing about his and Kolesky MacKenzie's early years at their pottery, MacKenzie recalled: "we did make all utilitarian ware. That is ware for use in a home. I don't have any examples of it because we didn't believe in saving our work; we thought you mustn’t save your work or you tend to live in the past. And so we had a rule that each one of us could save one pot at any given time, and if we found another pot that we wanted to save for our personal collection, we had to take the one we had been saving and put it out for sale."

MacKenzie also had durability in mind as he worked, writing in 1981: "in utilitarian pottery the durability of the finished product must be taken into account. Unlike a painting or sculpture, this work will be handled and mishandled, washed, and scraped with eating utensils. If a pot cannot withstand such treatment, it fails no matter how exciting it may appear to the eye." In the same article, he also advocated for physical interaction with ceramic works: "how often in museums we are admonished, 'don't touch,' and so deprived of a sense that now shows signs of atrophy through disuse. While this may make sense in a museum, it is quite unnecessary in the home, and it is here that the potter can reach out and invite tactile communication."

MacKenzie did all of his ceramic work on a kick-wheel. He primarily produced stoneware, though occasionally worked with porcelain. During his career, he used objects "such as files, wire, cheese cutters, and wheels from toy trucks to create patterns on his pieces." He also used "his glazes to enhance the shape of a pot." While she was alive, MacKenzie's first wife, Alix Kolesky MacKenzie, did much of his decoration. MacKenzie would later state that: "she could bring the pot to life, whereas if I did it, it was a disaster," to the point where he "quickly stopped almost all decoration."

At various times MacKenzie did not sign his work - in the 70s, and at times during the 2000s; he resumed the use of his chop at the end of 2009.

== Production ==
In a 2002 interview, MacKenzie stated: "I'm not a fast potter. But I'm a lot better potter now technically than I was [in the '50s] and – I don't know. But [Alix and I] made – I suppose we fired our big kiln – the big kiln held about 400 pots and we fired it about six times a year, I guess. And now I’ve got a kiln that holds 600 pots, and working alone I fire it about 12 times a year, so that explains the difference in making."

== Exhibitions ==
MacKenzie's work has been included in over 270 exhibitions. This is a partial list of his solo and group exhibitions.

- Walker Art Center, Minneapolis, Minnesota (1954, 1961)
- Art Institute of Chicago, Chicago, Illinois (1959)
- Everson Museum of Art, Syracuse, New York (1979, 1989)
- Renwick Gallery, Washington, D.C. (1979)
- Victoria and Albert Museum, London, England (1986)

== Collections ==
Collections that contain works by Warren MacKenzie:

- Metropolitan Museum of Art
- Nelson-Atkins Museum of Art
- Smithsonian American Art Museum
- Victoria and Albert Museum

== MacKenzie's writings (selected) ==
- "Minnesota Pottery: A Potter's View," Ceramics Monthly, vol. 29, no. 5 (May, 1981), 28-34.
- "Some Potter Thoughts," Design Quarterly, no. 54 (Pottery of Warren and Alix MacKenzie), Mendota Sculpture Foundry (1962), 2-19.
