= Charlotte Schlesinger =

German pianist and composer

- Charlotte Schlesinger at Black Mountain College
- Born: 1909; Berlin, Kingdom of Prussia, German Empire
- Died: 1976 (aged 66–67); London, England
- Education: Berlin Hochschule für Musik
- Occupations: Pianist and composer

Charlotte Schlesinger (1909–1976) was a German pianist and composer.

She was a student of Franz Schreker at the Berlin Hochschule für Musik from 1925 to 1930. In 1935 she left the Vienna Conservatory to teach at the Ukrainian S.S.S.R. Conservatory.

Schlesinger migrated to America as a refugee in 1938. She taught piano at Black Mountain College from fall 1946 through spring 1949, when she resigned along with several other faculty, including Theodore Dreier, Josef Albers, Anni Albers, and Trude Guermonprez.

She went on to teach for many years at the Wilson School of Music in Yakima, Washington.

== Recordings ==
- EntArteOper Festival - Kammermusik & Lieder songs : Es ziehen die Reihe lang; Wie hell das Licht mir scheinet; Was hör ich - on recital Hermine Haselböck (soprano)
