= Wildenhain (surname) =

Wildenhain is a German language surname. Notable people with the name include:

- Frans Wildenhain (1905–1980), German potter and sculptor
- Marguerite Wildenhain (1896–1985), American Bauhaus-trained ceramic artist, educator and author
