= School for American Crafts =

Educational institution for art and craft, now in Rochester, New York, US

- 2018 logo
- Established: January 14, 1945; 81 years ago
- Founder: Aileen Osborn Webb, American Craftsmen's Council
- Website: www.rit.edu/artdesign/school-american-crafts
- Formerly called: School for American Craftsmen (1945–1992)

The School for American Crafts (originally the School for American Craftsmen, SAC) was founded by Aileen Osborn Webb and the American Craftsmen's Council (ACC) in the 1940s. It sought to provide training in traditional crafts and "to develop and raise the standards of the hand arts in the United States."

The objective of the school was to train students who would be able to earn an independent living with their craftsmanship skills, whether as a craftsman, a designer of handmade objects, a teacher, or an industrial worker using fine skills. Initially, potential students included those affected by the Great Depression and World War II. Ceramics and other craft arts were seen as both profitable and therapeutic for soldiers returning from the war.

The School for American Craftsmen officially opened on January 14, 1945, at Dartmouth College in Hanover, New Hampshire. It moved to Alfred University in Alfred, New York in July 1946, before finding a permanent home in 1950 within the Rochester Institute of Technology, Rochester, New York. In 1992, the name was shortened to the School for American Crafts.

By affiliating itself with universities, rather than vocational schools, the School for American Crafts placed itself in a context of liberal and creative arts, not just technical ability. It was the first American school to create a complete professionally-based curriculum focused specifically on craft, rather than including craft as part of a broader course of study. It has been described as "the blueprint for contemporary fine craft education in the United States".

== History ==
=== Dartmouth College ===
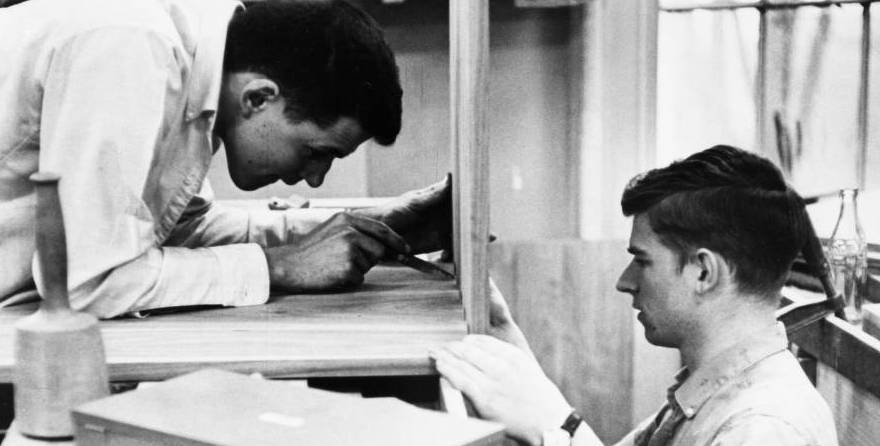
Woodworking at the School for American Craftsmen, 1963

The School for American Craftsmen was formally opened at Dartmouth College in Hanover, New Hampshire on January 14, 1945. The American Craftsmen's Council and Aileen Webb organized the program in cooperation with the Dartmouth College Student Workshop. Virgil Poling, director of the workshop and a member of the Council, became the School's Director of Training. In Dartmouth Alumni Magazine, Dartmouth College stated that their support was meant to be temporary, a two-year commitment to get the School started.

The first group of teachers included Linn Lovejoy Phelan and Marianne Haile in ceramics, Alden Hewes Wood and Miss Sammy Tate in metalworking, Robert Frederic Heartz in weaving, Eva Crockett in textiles, and Ernest Brace in woodworking. The first students were a Marine and a Seabee, veterans funded through the G.I. Bill. Seabees were uniformed men who did construction work in combat areas as part of the United States Naval Construction Battalions.

The first classes were held in Hallgarten Hall and Bissell Hall, built in 1867 as the College's gymnasium. The top floor of Bissell Hall hosted the woodworking shop while the basement provided space for the ceramics shop. At Hallgarten Hall, the main floor and basement were devoted to metalworking, and another two floors to textiles. The Council also purchased a mill in Lyme and a retired church in Haverhill for future use as continuation centers.

The training program planned to offer three terms in the "freshman" year, with a potential for continuation of up to two years. Because of the emphasis on becoming self-supporting, all teachers were producing craftsmen. Mornings were spent on classes; afternoons on production work. Classes included theory, technique, use of tools, design, marketing and pricing. Students worked cooperatively in craft-specific shops in a setting for large quantity production. The ability to engage in production work in a group setting was seen as good training for specific skills and as offering a potential career avenue, which could enable craftsmen to support themselves while doing "creative work of an individual character."

Student designs, if approved by a specialist committee, could be put into production and sold through America House in New York city or other craft organizations. A "good product" was defined as one that displayed "beauty of design", was technically well executed, was functional (meeting a "real need of use or decoration"), could be part of a ‘line’ of other products, was compatible with fashion trends, and had a reasonable price point for production. In this way, America House provided a "clinical laboratory" and "testing ground" for the SAC artists.

=== Alfred University ===
In July 1946 the School for American Craftsmen relocated to Alfred University in Alfred, New York. There it was given space in the former Crandall Hall barn. The program was framed as a two-year certificate program, the major crafts offered being metalsmithing, wrought iron, pottery, textiles, and woodworking. The class schedule required a commitment of 40 hours per week and 11 months a year. Producing marketable goods and selling them through America House was still a major focus, but there was no longer an industry-style production system.

An influential voice at the school was Frances Wright Caroé, the director of America House. She served on the review committee, and taught classes on production and marketing. As of January 1947, faculty included Ernest Frank Brace (woodworking), Edwin Blanchard Brown (design), Ethel Irene Mitchell (textiles), Linn Lovejoy Phelan (pottery), Herbert H. Sanders (pottery), Alden Hewes Wood (metalsmithing) and Laurits Christian Eichner (metalsmithing). Other early faculty included Charles Reese, and Philip Morton. Early students included Ronald Hayes Pearson and his sister, Lorna Pearson Watson.

Harold James Brennan became director of SAC in 1948, and focused much of his work on seeking out skilled faculty. Faced with a lack of qualified American craftspeople, he recruited faculty from Denmark for metalsmithing and woodworking. Among the new faculty was Danish-trained silversmith John Prip, who was born in New York but grew up in Denmark. He apprenticed as a silversmith in his father's business, and attended Copenhagen Technical College where he worked with Evald Nielson. He joined the School for American Craftsmen in 1948. Prip has been credited with helping to connect the design and craft cultures of Europe and America.

Danish studio furniture designer Tage Frid was also recruited in 1948, to teach woodworking at the School for American Craftsmen. His work was Danish-modern in style with light, delicate lines and curves that emphasized natural qualities of the wood. Frid is considered an originator of the studio furniture movement and credited with having "tremendous impact" on studio furniture making through his own work and the work of his students.

=== Rochester Institute of Technology, Rochester, New York ===
External videos
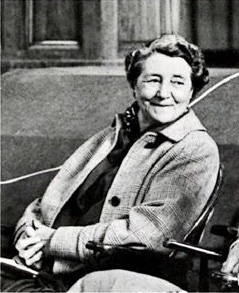
- “Aileen Osborn Webb - 2012 RIT Innovation Hall of Fame”, June 13, 2012.

In 1950 the School for American Craftsmen moved again, to the Rochester Institute of Technology, which was then located in downtown Rochester, New York. Mark Ellingson, President of RIT, approached Aileen Webb about the potential for the school to move to RIT. Webb served as a trustee at RIT and its predecessor the Mechanics Institute for over 20 years. A basis for developing an advanced art and crafts curriculum already had been laid by Susan Bevier (1822-1903). Bevier had given the Mechanics Institute her $70,000 art collection and her $300,000 estate. Thus, the school benefited from not one but two great women benefactors of art education, founder Aileen Osborn Webb and donor Susan Bevier.

The appointment of ceramist Frans Wildenhain as a faculty member in 1950 also had a broad impact on the school. Wildenhain had studied at the Bauhaus in Germany, and spent the war working as a teacher and production potter in Holland. Mature and experienced, he influenced all departments of the craft school, emphasizing creative and aesthetic concerns.

As part of a better-financed institution, the School for American Craftsmen had its own separate building. The move also gave it access to a larger cultural community and made it possible to open a shop and gallery to sell fine craftwork. Shop One (sometimes called Shop 1) was founded in 1952. It was not officially related to the school, but was organized by SAC faculty and alumni John Prip, Frans Wildenhain, Tage Frid and Ronald Pearson. Before Shop One opened, faculty and students had no local outlets for selling crafts; they had to drive to America House in New York city to sell their work. Shop One became a professional and social gathering place for craftspeople from the school and the wider area. As recognized in the 2014 exhibit "Shop One: Then and Now", its artistic impact was "vast", influencing generations of artists through a network of faculty and students.

When John Prip left the school in 1954, his chosen successor was highly respected Danish-born silversmith Hans Christensen. Christensen had studied at the College of the Technical Society in Copenhagen, Denmark and the School of the Arts and Crafts in Oslo, Norway. He worked with silversmith Georg Jensen as an apprentice and later became lead silversmith in the prototype department at Georg Jensen A/S. Christensen’s hollowware designs were noted for simplicity, balance, clean lines, natural curves, and the interaction of light and shadow on surfaces, combining both form and function. Christensen combined Danish Modern style, technical knowledge and a trade background, all assets to the SAC metalsmithing department.

As of 1963, the school's program involved four areas: "ceramics and sculpture; metal and jewelry; weaving and textile design; and woodworking and furniture design". Three degree programs were offered: Associate in Applied Science (two years), Bachelor of Fine Arts (four years) and Master of Fine Arts (five years).

=== Rochester Institute of Technology, Henrietta, New York ===
External videos
- “RIT School of American Crafts Video Tour”, January 31, 2013.

In 1961, the Rochester Institute of Technology decided to move to Henrietta, New York, now a suburb of Rochester. Construction at the new site began in 1964. Aileen Webb was vice chairman of the Building Committee for the new campus, helped to select the architects, and served on the committee that selected artwork for the buildings. The new campus was officially opened at a dedication ceremony in October 1968.

Around this time, the emphasis on production work at the school decreased. An increasing perception of the craftsperson as artist rather than artisan was personified by the appointment of American modernist Albert Paley to the metalworking faculty in 1969. In the metalsmithing department, the 1960s saw a shift away from the production of traditional holloware, to the creation of individualist contemporary jewelry. In 1972, Gary S. Griffin replaced Paley. The requirement of "functionalism" was subsequently dropped, aligning the program's requirements with the emerging perception of the craftsperson as artist.

Brennan recruited American furniture maker Wendell Castle to the faculty in 1962. Castle had studied sculpture at the University of Kansas. At SAC, Castle pioneered the technique of stack lamination in furniture design. He often created combined pieces of furniture with sweeping curves. Castle taught at the School for American Crafts from 1962 until 1969, at SUNY Brockport from 1969 until 1980, and founded the Wendell Castle School in 1980. He returned to SAC as an artist-in-residence in 1984. In 1988, the Wendell Castle School became part of the woodworking program at the School for American Craftsmen at RIT. Castle continued to be a tenured professor and artist-in-residence at the School for American Craftsmen.

In 1992 the school shortened its name to the School for American Crafts. Archives of the school are held by the Rochester Institute of Technology libraries.

== Notable faculty and students ==
Many notable American craft makers have been associated with the school as faculty or students.

=== Ceramics, pottery and glass ===
- Judi Whipple Danforth
- Julia Galloway
- Richard Hirsch
- Charles Loloma
- Otellie Loloma
- Daniel Rhodes
- Michael Rogers
- Frans Wildenhain
- Betty Woodman

=== Metalsmithing and jewelry ===
- Hans Christensen
- Sharon Church
- Arline Fisch
- Robert J. King
- Philip Morton
- Albert Paley
- Ronald Hayes Pearson
- John Prip
- Ronald Senungetuk
- Olaf Skoogfors
- Leonard Urso

=== Weaving and textiles ===
- Junco Sato Pollack
- Dorian Zachai

=== Woodworking and furniture design ===
- Wendell Castle
- Tage Frid
- Dan Jackson
- William Keyser
- Wendy Maruyama
- Judy Kensley McKie
- Jere Osgood
- Doug Sigler
- Rosanne Somerson
