= Robert J. King =

American silver designer

Robert James King
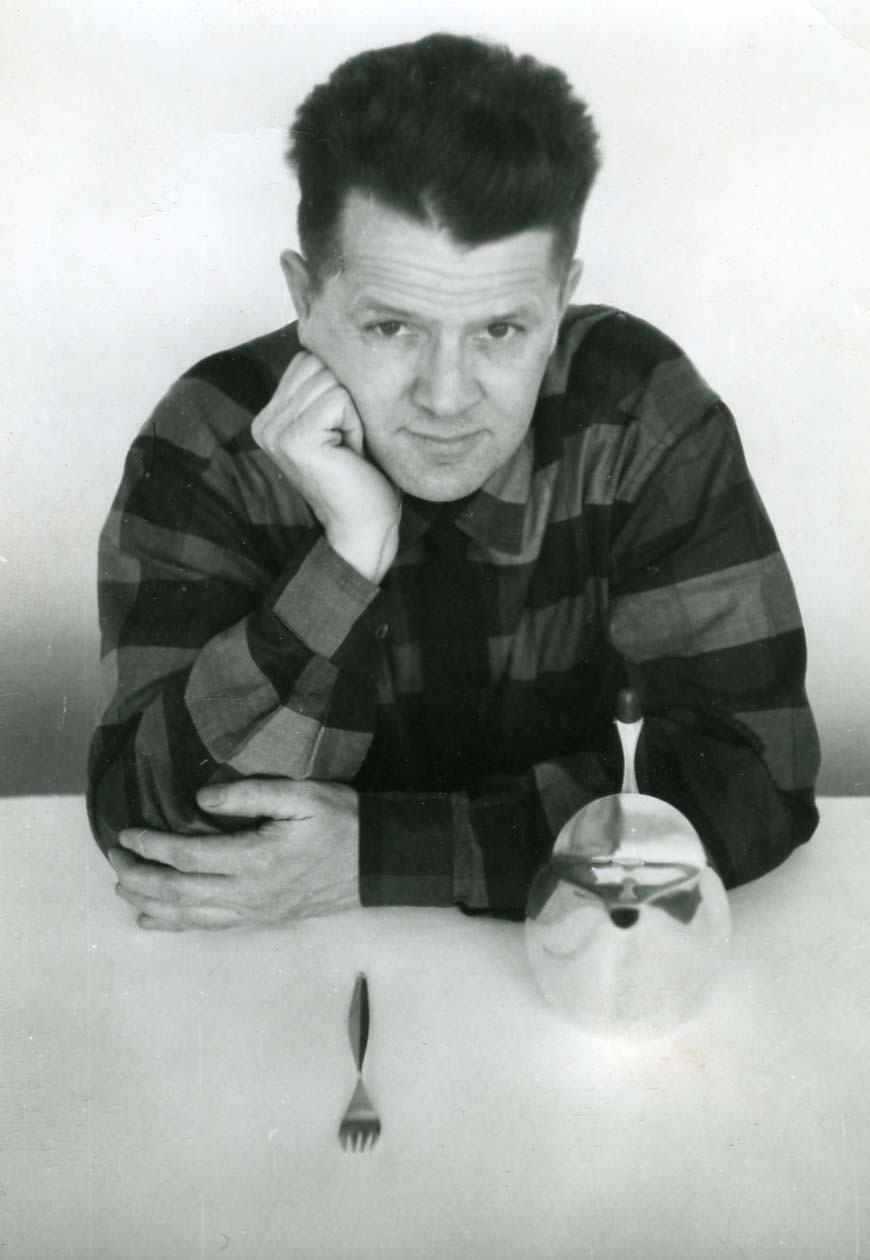
- Robert J. King at Towle Silver with his silver designs
- Born: January 17, 1917; Madison, WI
- Died: April 17, 2014 (aged 97); Wallingford, CT
- Education: University of Wisconsin - Madison (B.S. in Art Education) School for American Crafts (Certificate in Metalworking)
- Occupation: Silver designer

Robert J. "Bob" King was a midcentury modern silver designer best known for his 1950's Contour flatware and his Celestial Centerpiece at the 1964 World's Fair.

== Early life and education ==
Born in 1917 in Madison, Wisconsin, King began his art training before World War II, receiving his bachelor's degree in arts education from the University of Wisconsin–Madison. There he took a metalworking class with Professor John Van Koert. After graduating in 1941, King continued his artistic collaboration with Van Koert and Mary Norton, working in their commercial design studio in Madison making jewelry and novelties for about a year. King was then drafted into World War II and assigned to the Air Force as a photographer, serving in England.

After the war ended, King decided to attend the School for American Craftsmen (SAC) at Alfred, New York in January 1947. SAC was the first American professional school solely devoted to educating craftsmen and was founded by Aileen Osborn Webb. King studied enameling and metalworking at SAC alongside some of the most accomplished American craftsmen of the time, including Mitzi Otten, Lauritz Christian Eichner, and John Prip. It was also at SAC that he met his wife, Carol Thomson, a ceramics student.

== Career ==
After King graduated from SAC in 1949, Van Koert offered him a job in the design department at Towle Silversmiths, where he was now head designer. King married Carol and together they moved to Newburyport, Massachusetts where King started to work as a silver designer with Van Koert as his boss. He asked King to design and make a prototype of a flatware set that would be biomorphic and sleek like the modern Scandinavian designs that were gaining attention in the international design community. King created a silver design called Contour in 1950, which would be the first American sterling pattern to demonstrate post-World War II organic modernist design. It was first introduced in Knife, Fork, and Spoon, which was a traveling exhibition co-sponsored in 1951 by Towle and the Walker Art Center in Minneapolis.

The Museum of Modern Art included Contour in its 1951 Good Design exhibition, which helped promote the design commercially. It was also the only production-line American flatware ever included in Good Design. A six-piece place setting, along with a serving spoon, cream ladle, tablespoon, and carving set, was selected by the judges. The Good Design exhibitions opened up opportunities to create modern designs no longer utilizing external decoration. King's handmade work was exhibited in the American Pavilion at the Brussels World's Fair in 1958. King's pieces that were shown were a silver buffet server and silver ladle, along with a six-piece setting of flatware.

After thirteen years of working with Towle, King left the company in 1962 to become a staff designer at International Silver Company in Meriden, Connecticut. International was the only silverware manufacturer displaying its products at the 1964 New York World's Fair. The exhibit was located in the Pavilion of American Exteriors and the highlight of International's installation was the Moon Room. The focus of the room was a suspended table and floating chairs, all made of clear plastic and bathed in light to suggest stars and the galaxy. King designed a piece for the show called the Celestial Centerpiece, which was a circle of six candleholders surrounding a silver flower-like form tipped with 133 spinel sapphires. He also designed a pair of tapered candlesticks with blue enamel trim and a pair of five-light candelabra with spherical shapes that evoked planets. A carafe that King had made independently around 1952 was also displayed. Earlier it had been accepted for the competition and exhibition Designer Craftsmen USA 1953 and featured prominently in a Glamour magazine article of the same year.

Although King was forced to retire in 1977 when International's Meriden branch closed, he continued to create art in his home studio into his nineties. Starting in 1969 he taught himself pottery, quickly becoming an accomplished ceramic artist and a lifelong member of Wesleyan Potters in Middletown, Connecticut. He continued to win awards for both his metalwork and pottery. In 2006 he was honored for his silver design achievements in the exhibition and book Modernism in American Silver: 20th Century Design at the Renwick Gallery of the Smithsonian in DC, with his Celestial Centerpiece as a featured highlight.

== Death and legacy ==
Robert J. King died on April 17, 2014, in Wallingford, CT at the age of 97. Silver Magazine featured an article on his work (written by his granddaughter) in their Sept/Oct 2016 issue.

He has work represented in the following museums:

- Dallas Museum of Art, Jewel Stern American Silver Collection
- Memorial Art Gallery, University of Rochester
- Minnesota Museum of American Art
- Museum of Fine Arts, Boston
- Museum of Arts and Design, NYC
- Museum of Modern Art, NYC
- Philadelphia Museum of Art
- Renwick Gallery of the Smithsonian American Art Museum, DC
- Rhode Island School of Design Museum
- Yale University Art Gallery
