= Fred Fenster =

American metalsmith (1934–2024)

- Born: 1934; Bronx, New York City, New York, U.S.
- Died: June 24, 2024 (aged 89–90)
- Education: City College of New York, Cranbrook Academy of Art

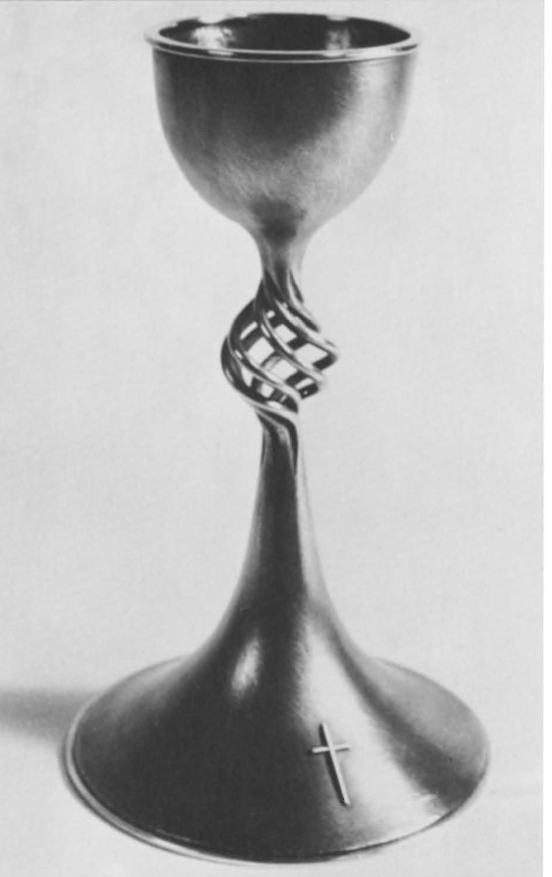
'Chalice' by Fred Fenster, ca. 1976

Fred Fenster (1934 – June 24, 2024) was an American metalsmith and professor emeritus of the University of Wisconsin–Madison where he taught art and education. He was particularly known for his work in pewter, influencing generations of metalsmiths. Fenster was named a Fellow of the American Craft Council in 1995.

== Career ==
Fenster received his B.S. in industrial arts from City College of New York in 1956. After teaching industrial arts in the Bronx he went to Cranbrook Academy of Art where he worked with Richard Thomas. His fellow students included Stanley Lechtzin, Michael Jerry, and Brent Kington. He received his M.F.A. in metalsmithing from Cranbrook in 1960. He spent the summer of 1960 working at the Rochester Institute of Technology with Hans Christensen. He then worked for Roger Berlin in a company doing silversmithing and industrial fabrication,

In 1961 Fenster became a professor at the University of Wisconsin–Madison. After more than 40 years at Madison, he became a professor emeritus in 2005.

Fenster lives in Sun Prairie, Wisconsin.

Fenster is a colleague and friend of Eleanor Moty. Their works were featured together in the exhibition and accompanying catalogue Metalsmiths and Mentors: Fred Fenster and Eleanor Moty (2006) at the University of Wisconsin-Madison.

He is a founding member of the Society of North American Goldsmiths (SNAG).

Fenster died on June 24, 2024, at the age of 89–90.

== Work ==
As a metalsmith, Fenster is influenced by the simplicity of Scandinavian design. Fenster makes objects that are both beautiful and usable, including jewelry, holloware, and flatware, using gold, silver, copper, and pewter. He is often commissioned to make Judaica and liturgical objects such as Kiddush cups. Fenster uses scoring and bending techniques to create elegant three-dimensional forms with clean, graceful lines.

"There's nothing sophisticated about the techniques I'm using. I'm working with the time-honored techniques of hammering, hammering, hammering, and then fabricating the parts that are hammered to shape. But sometimes the results are a little unusual." - Fred Fenster

== Awards ==
- 1984, American Pewter Guild award
- 1995, Fellow of the American Craft Council
- 1999, Underkofler Excellence in Teaching Award
- 2002, Hans Christensen Sterling Silversmiths Award, Society of American Silversmiths
- 2004, Renwick Alliance Award for Excellence in Teaching
- 2005, Gold Medal, American Craft Council
- 2011, Master Metalsmith, Metal Museum, Memphis, Tennessee
- 2015, Lifetime Achievement Award, Society of North American Goldsmiths

== Museums ==
Fenster's works are in collections including the Detroit Institute of Arts, Minnesota Museum of Art, National Ornamental Metal Museum, National Museum of American Art, Renwick Gallery, Smithsonian Institution, Yale University Art Gallery, and the National Museum of Contemporary Art, Seoul, South Korea.
