= Linda Threadgill =

American artist (born 1947)

Linda Threadgill (born 1947) is an American artist whose primary emphasis is metalsmithing. Her metal work is inspired by forms of nature and the interpretations she gleans from the intricate patterns it presents. She explores the foundation of nature to allude to nature and transform it into re-imagined, stylized plants forms.

== Early life and education ==
Born in Corpus Christi, TX, her early interests in art explored both ceramics and painting. She became interested in working with metal while an undergraduate, and received a Bachelor of Fine Arts degree from the Lamar Dodd School of Art, University of Georgia in 1970, where she studied with noted American metalsmith Robert Ebendorf. A portfolio of work based on her experimentation with photo-etching and electroforming led her to study with innovative metalsmith Stanley Lechtzin at the Tyler School of Art in Philadelphia, where she was awarded the Teaching Assistantship in the Metals Department, and earned a Master of Fine Arts degree in 1978.

A turning point in her career was taking machining class early on. From this class she learned how to create her own tool and the freedom that accompanies her with that understanding. Making her own tools, allowed for her to instigate new crafting processes without predetermined tool uses and limitations.

== Career ==
In 1984, she developed a small-scale portable spray etching machine based on technology used for the etching of printed circuit boards in the electronics industry. This etching machine's simple yet functional design led to its adoption by many university metals programs as well as by numerous private studio artists, enabling them to rapidly and accurately etch and pattern non-ferrous metals for jewelry and small sculpture. Threadgill has shared the technology, techniques and practices associated with her etching machine in over 80 workshops and technical presentations in the United States, Canada, England and Korea. Her work and process are also included in the 1996 ENCYCLOPEDIA OF JEWELRY TECHNIQUES. Her role in advancing the die-forming process has been lauded by such other studio art jewelers as Jan Baum. She now lives and maintains a studio in Santa Fe, New Mexico.

=== Technique ===
After retiring from teaching, she set off for an escape in Santa Fe, New Mexico, with her husband Jim, a woodworker, to immerse herself in an inspiring, nature-filled atmosphere, complementary to her creative preferences. As a woodworker, Jim crafts custom tools and equipment she may need for her projects, creating a collaboration of crafts between the pair.

Threadgill uses references like her imaginary botanical images and historical pieces decorating her home. Her work includes many wax mold-made, repetitive shapes of bronze, silver, or precious metal clay. She chooses to work in series and will have a vast number of projects going on at one time in diverse developmental stages. She does not choose sizes of her work consistently and, as a result, her methods vary from project to project. Her brass and bronze metals may get as larger as 1/4 an inch thick. To ensure these precise cuts and sizes, she will borrow from local resources like the usage of a water jet in Albuquerque.

== Collections ==
Her artistic metalwork is included in the collections of The Victoria and Albert Museum, London, England, The Smithsonian American Art Museum, Washington, DC, The Museum of Fine Arts, Boston, MA, Her work has included both teapots and rings.

== Additional affiliations ==
She served as a Craftsman Trustee to the American Craft Council from 1996-1999, and in 2000, she was designated Trustee Emerita. In 2001, she was named an Artisan Member of the Society of American Silversmiths. She headed the Metals Program at the University of Wisconsin-Whitewater from 1979-2003 as Professor Emerita.

== Awards and recognitions ==
In 1979, she was awarded a Florida Fine Arts Council Individual Artist Fellowship based on her studio work. Later this same year, she was invited to join the faculty of the Art Department at the University of Wisconsin-Whitewater. In 1983 she was named a Distinguished Member of the Society of North American Goldsmiths, and in 1984, received a National Endowment for the Arts Visual Arts Fellowship.

In 1994, she received the University of Wisconsin-Whitewater Chancellor's Award for Outstanding Research.

During her tenure on the faculty of the University of Wisconsin, she also received 11 University of Wisconsin Faculty Research Grants, and was awarded the University of Wisconsin Outstanding Research Award in 1987, 1995 and 1999.

In 2005 she was named a Fellow of the American Craft Council.

In 2015, she was named Master Metalsmith by the National Ornamental Metal Museum, Memphis, TN, who mounted a major retrospective exhibition of her work in late 2015. This exhibition is illustrated in the catalogue "Cultivating Ornament."

In 2018, she was nominated for the National Museum of Women in the Arts' Women to Watch: 2018 exhibition as a New Mexico representative.

== Bibliography ==
Linda Threadgill (2015) Cultivating ornament, Linda Threadgill, master metalsmith. Memphis: Metal Museum.

== General references ==
- “Conceptualizing Ornament", Metalsmith Magazine, Vol. 29, No. 3, 2009.
- Contemporary Women Sculptors: An Illustrated Bibliographical Directory. Phoenix, AZ, Oryx Press, 1985.
- Hardy, Saralyn Reese. A Creative Legacy: A History of the National Endowment for the Arts Visual Artists' Fellowship Archive. Washington, DC, The National Museum of American Art, Smithsonian Institution, 1997.
- Rainwater, Dorothy. Encyclopedia of American Silver Manufacturers, 5th edition. Schiffer Publishers, 2003.
- Smith, Paul J. and Edward Lucie-Smith. Craft Today: Poetry of the Physical. New York, American Craft Museum: Weidenfeld & Nicolson, 1986.
- Taragin, Davira S. Contemporary Crafts and the Saxe Collection. Hudson Hills Press, 1993.
- “The Structural Origins of Ornament." Ornament Magazine, Vol. 34, No. 4, 2011.
