= Eleanor Moty =

American metalsmith and jewelry artist (born 1945)

- Born: 1945 (age 80–81); Glen Ellyn, Illinois
- Occupations: Metalsmith and jewelry artist

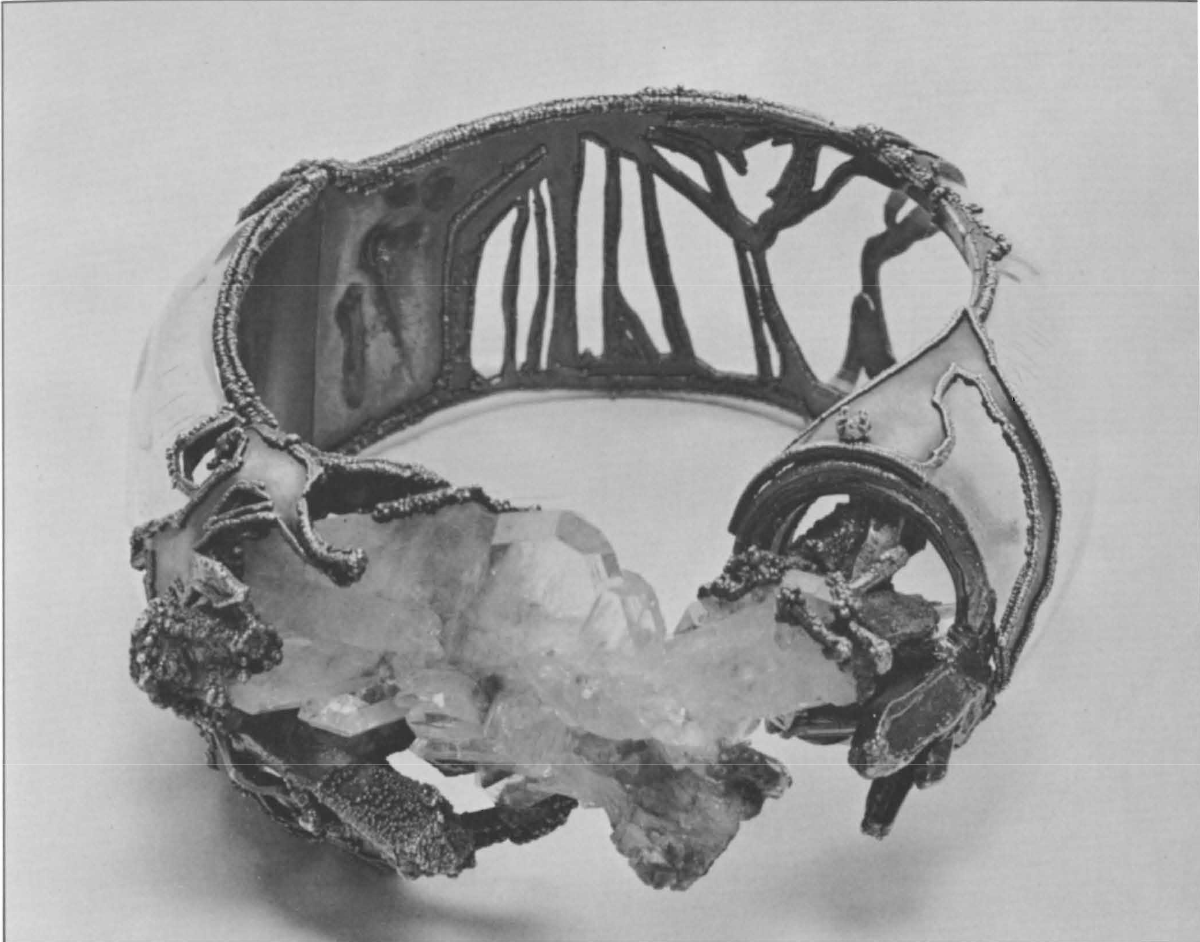
Piece by Eleanor Moty, American Metal Work, 1976

Eleanor Moty (born 1945), is an American metalsmith and jewelry artist. Her experimentation with industrial processes, such as photoetching and electroforming, was revolutionary in the field of American art jewelry in the 1960s and 1970s.

== Career ==
=== Childhood ===
Eleanor Moty was born in Glen Ellyn, Illinois. Moty was raised on a rural farm with little exposure to art as a child. In high school, Moty made and sold stained glass. Her first introduction to jewelry was a trip with her high school art teacher to Northern Illinois University. Following this visit, she attended a little sister weekend with her older sister Joyce at University of Illinois at Urbana-Champaign. This trip solidified her decision to study jewelry there with Robert von Neumann.

=== Early career ===
Moty attended the University of Illinois, Urbana and earned her BFA in 1968. While there she explored electroplating, electroforming, and the photographic image in her work. She studied under Robert van Neumann and visiting artist J. Fred Woell. She learned photo fabrication techniques in engineering laboratories with technician Jim Cummings.

Moty received her MFA in 1971 from the Tyler School of Art where she studied with Stanley Lechtzin, a leader in the metals and jewelry field for his research and advancements in electroforming. Metal artist and sculptor, Albert Paley, was a year ahead of Moty at Tyler, where he also taught as an assistant. He offered Moty technical advice and influenced her pin stem and metals designs. During graduate school, Moty became aware of the jewelry work of Miye Matsukata. She respected Matsukata's incorporation of non-precious stones such as rutilated quartz with precious stones and found objects. Creating settings for stones such as rutilated and tourmalinated quartz remained a material of interest for Moty over the next thirty years.

=== Mid-career ===
Moty was an early pioneer of the processes of photo etching and electroplating as applied to jewelry and led lectures and workshops on the subject. She also contributed to an authoritative article on photo etching processes for jewelry and three dimensional work in Craft Horizons in 1971. In 1972 she began teaching at the University of Wisconsin in Madison, where she was a colleague of Fred Fenster. Their works were featured together in the exhibition and accompanying catalogue Metalsmiths and Mentors: Fred Fenster and Eleanor Moty (2006) at the University of Wisconsin-Madison. During the late 1970s Moty explored the use of gemstones in her work and was influenced by the jewelry of Margaret De Patta after visiting her 1976 retrospective at the Oakland Museum.

In the 1980s her interest in faceted planes and geometric designs instigated a working relationship with chemist, Raoul Reiser. In 1980 Moty was the first woman and first humanities professor to receive the H.I. Romnes Faculty Fellowship for excellence in teaching at the University of Wisconsin, Madison. She received two National Endowment for the Arts craftsmen's fellowships in 1988 and 1975.

=== Late career ===
In the late 1990s Moty's visit to Steven Holl's Chapel of St. Ignatius in Seattle, Washington focused her new work to include an architectural focus and more complex-cut stones that offer varying viewpoints. In 1998 Moty was elected to the American Craft Council College of Fellows by her peers. From 1982 to 1991 she was a trustee of the Haystack Mountain School of Crafts in Deer Isle, Maine. She was an honorary board member of the James Renwick Alliance from 1996 to 1999.

== Sources ==
- Cardinale, Robert. "A Decade of Metalsmithing in the United States: 1970-1980," "Metalsmith" Vol. 1, No. 3, 1980.
- Clowes, Jody, Fred Fenster, and Eleanor Moty. "Metalsmiths and Mentors: Fred Fenster and Eleanor Moty at the University of Wisconsin-Madison". Madison, WI: Chazen Museum of Art, University of Wisconsin-Madison, 2006.
- Foley, Suzanne. "Eleanor Moty." "American Craft", Vol. 47, No. 3, 1987.
- Greenbaum, Toni. "Constructivism and American Studio Jewelry, 1940 to the present," "Studies in the Decorative Arts (U.S.A)" Vol. 6, No. 1, 1999.
- Moty, Eleanor. "Workshop: Photofabrication," "Craft Horizons" Vol. 31, No. 3, (June 1971).
- Moran, Lois, ed. "American Craft Council Awards." "American Craft", Vol. 58, No. 5, 1998.
- Simon, Marjorie. "Eleanor Moty: Romancing The Stone," "Metalsmith" Vol. 32, No. 1, 2012.
- Strauss, Cindi, and Helen W. Drutt. Ornament As Art: Avant-garde Jewelry from the Helen Williams Drutt Collection, the Museum of Fine Arts, Houston. Stuttgart, Germany: Arnoldsche Art Publishers in association with the Museum of Fine Arts, Houston, 2007.
