= Brad Lynch =

Brad Lynch may refer to:

- Brad Lynch (footballer) (born 1997), Australian rules footballer
- Brininstool + Lynch, Chicago architecture firm named for partners David Brininstool and Brad Lynch
