= Moulton family (silversmiths) =

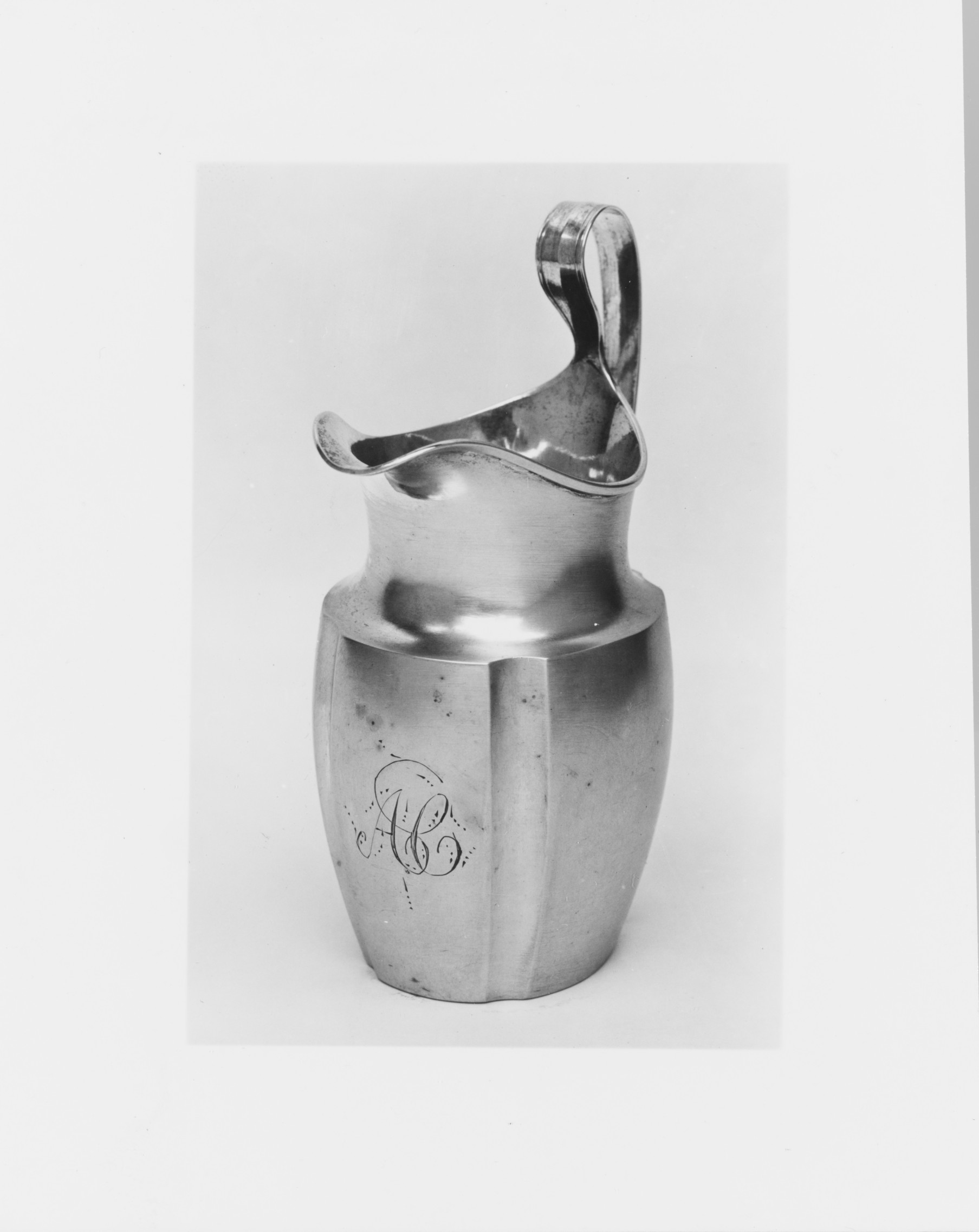
Creamer by Joseph Moulton, circa 1800

The Moulton family were silversmiths in and around Newbury, Massachusetts that extended across six generations for two hundred years. They are sometimes claimed to have the longest continuous span of silversmithing of any American family.

- William Moulton (1615-1664) immigrated in 1637 with his two brothers John and Thomas from Norfolk, England, and settled on Winnacunnet Road in Hampton, New Hampshire.
- William Moulton II (1664-1732) left the family farm in Hampton in 1682, at age 18, and settled near the Merrimack River in a section of Newbury, Massachusetts that would later become Newburyport. By some accounts, he was the first in six generations of silversmiths. While he did buy and sell silver goods, he was primarily a general trader. His son Joseph Moulton (1694-1750) has also been proposed as the first Moulton to work in silver, but he was actually a blacksmith by trade, though he likely turned his hand to whatever came through his shop door. Although most of the Moultons carried on their craft in Newburyport, some went to other communities where they established themselves as silversmiths.
- William Moulton III (1720–1793) was the first verified silversmith. He worked from 1742 to 1762 as a silversmith in Newburyport, Massachusetts, and from 1762 to 1788 in Hampstead, New Hampshire. He then moved in a covered wagon to Marietta, Ohio, carrying his silversmith's tools with him. He was one of the forty-eight pioneers to settle in the Northwest Territory and is considered one of its founders.
- Joseph Moulton (1744–1816), his son and the fourth in line, worked from about 1764 to 1810 as a silversmith in Newburyport, with home and shop on State Street. He had four sons who were silversmiths. 1) Ebenezer moved to Boston. 2) Enoch moved to Portland, Maine, each of them continuing their crafts in their respective places. 3) Abel inherited his father's business in Newburyport.
- William Moulton IV (1772–1861) was the fifth in line of the Moulton chain. He worked from 1795 to 1845 as a silversmith in Newburyport, Massachusetts, establishing his own shop there. In addition to supplying church silver and other vessels, he made jewelry in his shop on Merrimack Street. William had two apprentices, Anthony Francis Towle and William P. Jones.
- Joseph Moulton (1814–1903), his son and the sixth and final in line, in 1857 sold the silver business he inherited to his father's two apprentices, Anthony Francis Towle and William P. Jones (who were also his apprentices), to form Towle & Jones, Co. In 1873, the son of Anthony Francis Towle, Edward Bass Towle, was added to the business, and the name was changed to A.F. Towle & Son. It was in business through 1902, at which point their dies were purchased by Rogers, Lunt and Bowlen, who were later to become Lunt Silversmiths.

A number of examples of early silver items produced by the Moulton family are in the Strawbery Banke Museum in Portsmouth, New Hampshire.

== See also ==
- Media related to Moulton family at Wikimedia Commons
- Lunt Silversmiths
- Towle Silversmiths
