= Racine Art Museum =

Art museum in Wisconsin, United States

Coordinates: 42.728282°N 87.782640°W

- Racine Art Museum and RAM's Charles A. Wustum Museum of Fine Arts
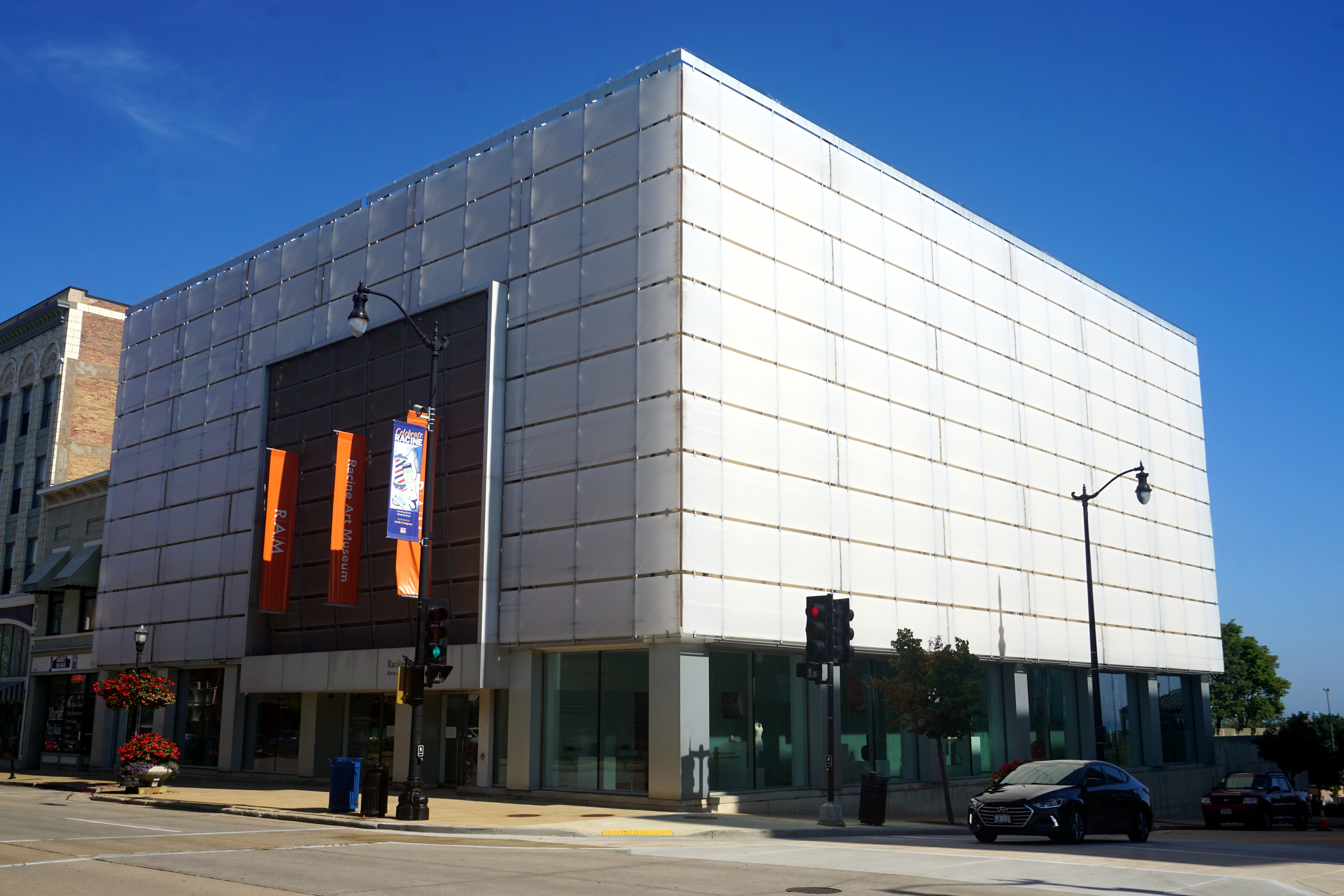
- Established: November 16, 1941
- Location: Racine, Wisconsin
- Type: Contemporary craft
- Visitors: 60,000 per year (2017)
- Director: Robb Woulfe (2025)
- Curator: Lena Vigna (2018)
- Public transit access: Ryde Racine
- Website: www.ramart.org

The Racine Art Museum (RAM) and RAM's Charles A. Wustum Museum of Fine Arts are located in Racine, Wisconsin, U.S. The museum holds the largest and most significant contemporary craft collection in North America, with more than 9,500 objects from nationally and internationally recognized artists. The Racine Art Museum's mission is to exhibit, collect, preserve, and educate in the contemporary visual arts. Its goal is to elevate the stature of craft to fine arts by presenting contemporary crafts alongside paintings and sculptures.

== History ==
Jennie E. Wustum, widow of Charles A. Wustum, died on December 3, 1938, and left their house, property and a small trust fund to the City of Racine, Wisconsin, for the creation of a public art museum and park. The 12-acre (0.049 km^{2}) property was on the edge of town, across the street from the J & W Horlicks malted milk factory. The Italianate mansion was of brick construction with a cupola on top.

A city ordinance creating the Wustum Museum and Park Commission was passed in 1940, and in 1941, the property became the Charles A. Wustum Museum of Fine Arts. The museum's grand opening was on November 16, 1941, and Sylvester Jerry was named the first director. The first exhibit was 96 paintings by Wisconsin artists, followed by a collection of contemporary lithographs from the Redfern Gallery in London, and watercolors by Midwestern artists.

The museum's permanent collection began with a donation of 294 Works Progress Administration (WPA) artworks including textiles from the Milwaukee Handicraft Project, and paintings, photographs, and block prints from Wisconsin- and New York-based artists. Jerry, who was a supervisor for the WPA Art Program before joining the museum, arranged a 99-year lease for the collection which contained works by artists such as lithographer Mabel Dwight, painter Rufino Tamayo, and photographers Brett Weston and Bernice Abbott. The WPA works continue to be shown in occasional exhibitions, the latest in 2017.

In the 1980s, the museum began to focus on crafts by American artists. Karen Johnson Boyd was a major benefactor to the museum donating over 1750 items including 200 objects in 1991 that included works by Wendell Castle, Dale Chihuly, Lia Cook, Albert Paley, and Toshiko Takaezu. The high quality of these items encouraged donations from others collectors creating the largest collection of contemporary craft in North America.

== Racine Art Museum ==
In 2000, the museum expanded into downtown Racine by moving into an historic building donated by the M&I Bank of Racine. The renovation of the 1874 bank building, which was designed by Brininstool & Lynch of Chicago, involved the installation of a translucent acrylic shell around the upper two floors of the existing limestone building. The acrylic panels were 18 inches off the surface of the building; they allowed the colors of the limestone to show through during the day and were illuminated at night. The new building increased the museum's space from 15,500 to 40,000 sq ft (1,440 to 3,720 m^{2}) and included a sculpture garden, an art library, and large storefront windows used for displays. The interior of the building was gutted to create exhibition space including a double-height gallery for larger objects.

The $6.5 million funding for the renovation included a gift of $2.7 million from S.C. Johnson of Racine. Additional funds were used to upgrade the original museum which was retained for educational purposes and regional art displays.

== Collection ==
RAM's permanent collection features more than 9,500 artworks from internationally recognized artists such as Wendell Castle, Dale Chihuly, Lia Cook, Arline Fisch, Joel Philip Myers, Albert Paley, Toshiko Takaezu, and Claire Zeisler.

- Ceramics: over 1500 objects including pieces from Rudy Autio, Richard DeVore, Ruth Duckworth, Adrian Saxe, Akio Takamori, Toshiko Takaezu, Robert Turner, and Betty Woodman. The collection also includes over 500 ceramic teapots from the 1950s through the 2000s, one of the largest such collections in the United States.
- Fibers: over 450 objects, many of which are sculptural works that employ basketry techniques or materials. The collection contains works by Dorothy Gil Barnes, Lia Cook, Carol Eckert, Lilliam Elliott, John McQueen, Ed Rossbach and Claire Zeisler.
- Glass: works from artists Dale Chihuly, Dan Dailey, Michael Glancy, Judy Jensen, Harvey Littleton, Joel Phillip Meyers and Ann Wolff.
- Metals: over 1,200 works including artists Chunghi Choo, Keven O'Dwyer, Robert W. Ebendorf, Fred Fenster, Arline Fisch, Ken Loeber, Eleanor Moty, Albert Paley, and Earl Pardon.
- Wood: includes turned vessels, as well as furniture. One of the highlights of the collection is a Wendell Castle desk that was in the Objects: USA exhibition in 1969. Other artists include Gary Knox Bennett, John Cederquist, Thomas Hucker, Mark Lindquist, Matt Moulthrop, Jere Osgood, Norm Sartorius, and Robert Stocksdale.
- Handmade books: hand-printed letterpress and larger offset lithography works. The collection includes work from Scott McCarney, Patti Tyrol, Erica Von Horn, Don Celender, Jim Lee and Bonnie O'Connell.
