= Richard Hirsch =

American abstract ceramic sculptor

Richard A. Hirsch (born 1944) is an American abstract ceramic sculptor. He received a BS in art education from the State University of New York at New Paltz in 1956, an MFA in ceramics from the Rochester Institute of Technology's School for American Craftsmen in 1971 and an honorary Ph.D. from National Taiwan University of Arts in 2008. He taught at Nazareth College (New York), Sault College (Ontario, Canada), Boston University and at the Rochester Institute of Technology, where he currently holds the title of professor emeritus, College of Art and Design.

Ceremonial Cup #14 by Richard Hirsch, 1983, Honolulu Museum of Art

Hirsch studied ancient Latin American and Chinese cultures, as well as traditional Japanese raku. Ceremonial Cup #14, in the collection of the Honolulu Museum of Art, demonstrates how the artist combined the form of a Shang dynasty tripod vessel with a raku ware surface. The Art Gallery of Greater Victoria (Victoria, British Columbia, Canada), the Benaki Museum (Athens, Greece), the Boca Raton Museum of Art (Boca Raton, Florida), the Burchfield Penney Art Center (Buffalo, New York), the Carnegie Museum of Art (Pittsburgh, Pennsylvania), the China Art Academy Museum (Hangzhou, China)], the Daum Museum of Contemporary Art (Sedalia, Missouri), the Everson Museum of Art (Syracuse, New York), the Fuller Craft Museum (Brockton, Massachusetts), the Gardiner Museum (Toronto, Ontario, Canada), the High Museum of Art (Atlanta, Georgia), the Honolulu Museum of Art, the lcheon World Ceramic Center (Gyeonggi-do, South, Korea), the Memorial Art Gallery (Rochester, New York), the Mint Museum (Charlotte, North Carolina), the Museum of Arts and Design (New York City), the Museum of Fine Arts, Boston. The National Museum of Art (Riga, Latvia), the Nelson-Atkins Museum of Art (Kansas City, Missouri), the New Orleans Museum of Art, the Nora Eccles Harrison Museum of Art (Logan, Utah), the Ohi Museum (Kanazawa, Japan), the Racine Art Museum (Racine, Wisconsin), the Sørlandets Art Museum (Kristiansand, Norway) and the Yingge Ceramics Museum (Taipei, Taiwan) are among the public collections holding work by Richard A. Hirsch.
