= Dyrberg/Kern =

Danish jeweller (1985)

Dyrberg/Kern A/S
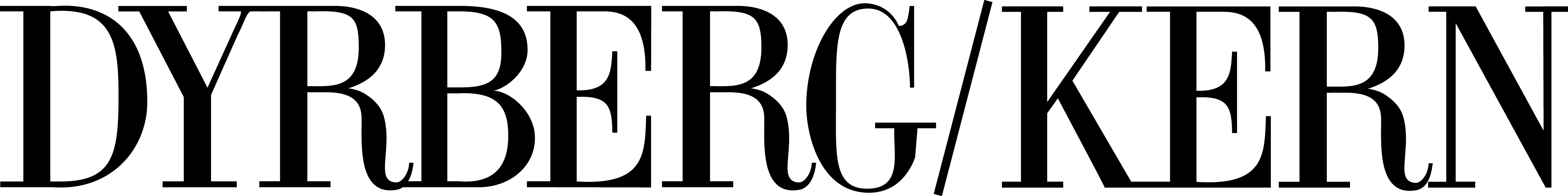
- Company type: Private
- Industry: Jewellery; Retail
- Founded: 1985; 41 years ago
- Founders: Gitte Dyrberg; Henning Kern
- Headquarters: Copenhagen, Denmark
- Products: Jewellery; watches
- Website: dyrbergkern.com

Dyrberg/Kern A/S is a Danish jewelry company founded by Gitte Dyrberg and Henning Kern in 1985.

The company started when Gitte Dyrberg and Henning Kern met at the Danish Design School and began collaborating on a clothing line for women as well as jewelry. In 1990 Gitte and Henning decided to focus only on fashion jewellery which they have been doing since then.

Dyrberg/Kern is headquartered on Oesterbro in Copenhagen, Denmark. The jewellery and watches are designed in-house and handmade.

== History ==
Gitte Dyrberg and Henning Kern met in 1985 and in the beginning they designed women's clothes with matching accessories. The design duo showed their first fashion show in 1987 when they graduated from Copenhagen School of Design. After 3 years Henning Kern and Gitte Dyrberg decided to focus only on fashion jewellery. In 1997 Dyrberg/Kern was nominated for the Gazelle award for the first time. In 2001 Dyrberg/Kern received the King Frederik IX's Award for Excellence in Export. In 2004 the company received the award Entrepreneur of the Year.

In 2010 the 25 year anniversary was celebrated with the release of The Monogram Collection with Dyrberg/Kern monogram coins and also the book "Celebrating 25 years of jewellery love" In 2011/2012 the company decided to expand its business with the launch of the first Sterling Silver collection

- 1985: Gitte and Henning meet and begin designing women clothes and accessories
- 1987: Graduation from Copenhagen School of Design
- 1990: Decision to only focus on fashion jewellery
- 1997: Nominated for the Gazelle award for the first time
- 2001: Received the King Frederik IX's Award for Excellence in Export
- 2004: Received the award Entrepreneur of the Year
- 2010: 25 years anniversary
- 2011/12: Launch of Sterling Silver collection

== Product lines ==
=== Fashion jewellery ===
The Fashion Jewellery collection is launched two times a year: Spring/Summer collection & Autumn/Winter collection. Every collection has an overall theme with small stories turned into series.

=== Sterling silver ===
The Sterling Silver collection consists of several small jewellery stories with some styles also available with 18 carat gold finish.

=== Watches ===
Dyrberg/Kern also has a watch collection.
