= Mads Kjøller Damkjær =

Mads Kjoeller Damkjaer (born 4 April 1975) is a Danish industrial designer, strategist and entrepreneur. A double gold winner at Red Dot Design Awards, If Design Awards, D&AD Awards and Creative Circle Awards. Married to designer and entrepreneur Sidsel Kjøller Damkjær. He was the managing partner at the design and innovation agency Goodmorning Technology (2004-2013) in Copenhagen, London, New York (2008–2010) and Hong Kong (2010–2011) and has founded or co-founded several companies such as Contxt (2002), the Copenhagen Parts (2009) transportation and life style bike parts, PART (2007) and Future fwd (2012). As an investor he established the impact venture company Tomorrow Projects in San Francisco in 2011. He is an adviser and board member at several Start-up Companies as well as organisations as the Danish Design Association and Companies such as the architecture firm SHL/Schmidt Hammer Lassen in Denmark, Singapore, London and China. Mads has had leading roles in managing consulting firms as Implement Consulting Group and PA Consulting Group as Head of Innovation & Strategy and co-owner of the company, having worked out of London since 2014. He worked for RADI Designers and Robert Stadler in 2003 in Paris and is educated from the Danish Design School in Copenhagen (1999–2004), has studied part of MBA at AVT Business School (2012-2013) and has received certificates from Stanford University (2013-2015), Yale School of Business (2012) and Harvard Business School (2013). In May 2010 he was announced one of the 100 best business people under 35 yrs in the field of innovation in Denmark by Berlingske Business. Kjoeller Damjaer developed the Creative Leadership Impact Framework (CLIF) in 2014, an assessment and developing method for leaders and coined the term LeadTech as a term applied to leadership technology tools in 2010. Mads Kjoeller Damkjaer has won several strategy, innovation and leadership awards. On 17 November 2011 Mads was nominated with the Award by The Danish Design Counsel as one of the greatest talents in Scandinavia. In 2012 he received the Rising Star Award in New York, US. He lived in California ( Los Angeles and San Francisco) part of 2016.

== Designs ==
Mads Kjoeller Damkjaer has managed design for brands such as Luceplan, Erik Jørgenen, Fritz Hansen and Sony Ericsson. Some of the most known designs include the “Lightscape" lamp for Louis Poulsen and the Bike Porter for Copenhagen Parts. Goodmorning Technology's work has been exhibited internationally such as at Cooper–Hewitt, National Design Museum in New York City and at the World Expo 2010 in Shanghai.

== Awards and recognition ==
- 2003 1. Prize for the Danish police uniform jacket for Danish police
- 2007 iF Design Award
- 2007 Index: Design Top Nomination
- 2008 Print Magazine Award
- 2008 iF Design Award
- 2008 D&AD Design Award
- 2009 Creative Circle Nomination
- 2010 iF Design Award
- 2010 Innovation Award, The Danish Chamber of Commerce
- 2010 D&AD Design Award Nominated
- 2010 Berlingske Business talent 100 Award
- 2011 Talent Award / Grundfos Travelling Scholarship, The Danish Design Counsel
- 2012 CBA Scholarship / AVT Business School
