= Heikki Seppä =

Finnish-American metalsmith

Heikki Seppä

Heikki Markus Seppä, also known as Heikki Seppa (March 8, 1927 – May 18, 2010) was a Finnish-born American master metalsmith, educator, and author. He taught at Washington University in St. Louis, from 1965 to 1992.

== Personal life and Education ==
Heikki Seppä was born in Säkkijärvi, Finland. For much of his childhood, Seppä lived in a children's home until leaving at age 14 to attend the Helsinki Goldsmith's School. In 1941 he studied metalsmithing at Goldsmith's School in Helsinki, and later at the Georg Jensen silver factory in Copenhagen.

In 1950 he emigrated with his first wife to Prince Rupert, British Columbia. Then they moved to Bloomfield Hills, Michigan, where he attended Cranbrook Academy of Art. They stayed together until her death in 1993.

In 1998, he moved to Bainbridge Island, Washington and married metalsmith Laurie A. Lyall. He died at his Bainbridge home at age 83.

== Career ==
Seppä taught art in Louisville, Kentucky from 1960 to 1965. He later taught at the St. Louis School of Fine Arts at Washington University in St. Louis from 1965 until his retirement at 1992 as Professor Emeritus. He was a founding member of the Society of North American Goldsmiths. His metal sculptures are in private collections, as well as in museums including the Renwick Gallery of the Smithsonian American Art Museum.

Replicas of Seppä's sculpture "The Search" are given to awardees of the Eliot Society's "Search Award" at Washington University.

== Awards ==
- American Craft Council Fellow and national treasure, 1987
- Art and Education Council Award, St. Louis, 1996
- The Hans Christiansen award, Society of American Silversmiths, 2003
- SNAG Lifetime Achievement award, Society of North American Goldsmiths, 2008

== Bibliography ==
- Form Emphasis for Metalsmiths (1978) ISBN 978-0-87338-212-0
