= Arline Fisch =

American artist and educator (1931–2024)

- Born: August 21, 1931; New York City, U.S.
- Died: August 20, 2024 (aged 92); San Diego, California, U.S.
- Known for: Painting, jewellery, metalworking

Arline Fisch (August 21, 1931 – August 20, 2024) was an American artist and educator. She is known for her work as a metalsmith and jeweler, pioneering the use of textile processes from crochet, knitting, plaiting, and weaving in her work in metal. She developed groundbreaking techniques for incorporating metal wire and other materials into her jewelry.

== Learning ==
Arline Fisch was born in Brooklyn, New York City on August 21, 1931, and grew up in New York. She first was taught to sew by her mother, and made many of her own clothes. Her father later gave her lessons at Singer Sewing as a gift so that she and her mother would stop arguing about sewing. Fisch also picked up a passion for bright colors from her father, who loved red.

She studied at Skidmore College, receiving her B.S. in Art in 1952. She received her M.A. in Art in 1954 from the University of Illinois at Urbana–Champaign, where she took classes in metalworking with Arthur J. Pulos.

After teaching drawing, painting, and design for two years at Wheaton College, she traveled to Copenhagen, Denmark, on a Fulbright Grant to study silversmithing. While there she was able to work in a large jewelry workshop at Bernhard Hertz Guldvaerefabrik, to develop her technical skills. She received three additional Fulbright grants, one to conduct further research in Denmark and two to lecture in Austria and Uruguay.

Fisch also attended and has taught at Haystack Mountain School of Crafts where she was introduced to weaving by Jack Lenor Larsen and Ted Hallman. By the 1960s she was beginning to "incorporate weaving in her jewelry" and think about "structuring metal in woven forms". While in Denmark on her second Fulbright in 1966, she spent part of her time studying chasing at the Goldsmiths’ School (Guldsmedehøjskolen) in Copenhagen.

== Teaching ==
Fisch taught at Wheaton College (1954–1956), Skidmore College (1957–1961), and San Diego State University (1961–2000).

She founded the San Diego State University program in Jewelry and Metalsmithing in 1961. She retired in 2000, becoming Professor Emerita of Art at San Diego State University.

== Metalworking ==
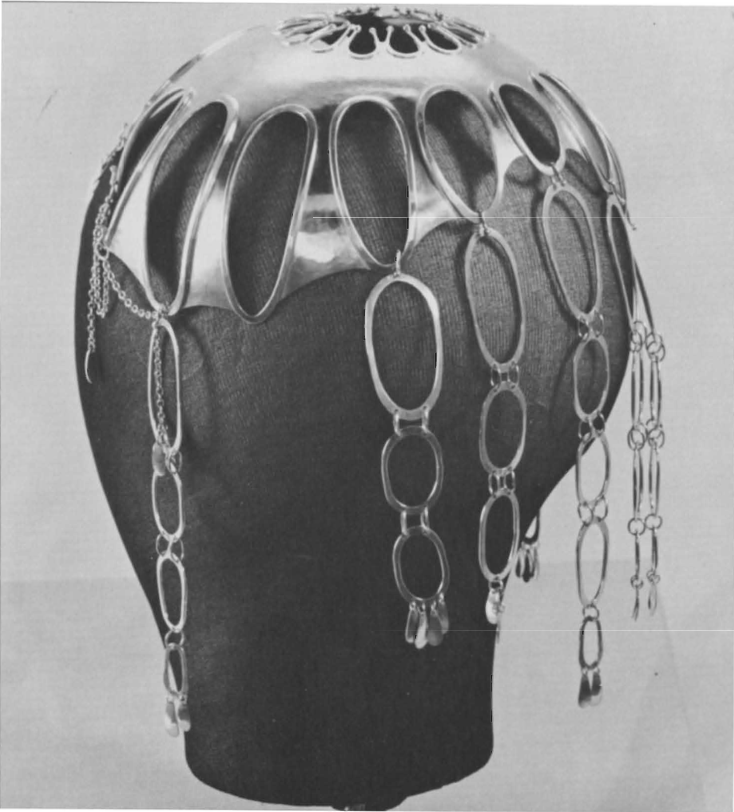
Arline Fisch, Hat, 1976

Fisch is best known for the way she handles metal in her pieces. She works with thin wire to create forms that have been manipulated in similar ways to knitted, woven or braided fabric. Fisch has exhibited extensively all over the world in group shows and solo exhibitions.

Her book, Textile Techniques in Metal for Jewelers, Textile Artists and Sculptors, is a demonstration of the techniques she developed while trying to combine the textures of weaving with a metal material.

She stated that jewelry of ancient cultures is a continued reference and inspiration for her work. In the exhibition American Metal Work, 1976 at the Sheldon Memorial Art Gallery, her sterling silver Hat was described as equally suited to a Byzantine princess, a modern bridal costume or an evening dress. Her exhibit Creatures from the Deep created an underwater world of floating sea creatures, jellyfish, corals and sea anemones, knitted and crocheted from wire. Versions of this work were installed in 2008 at the Racine Art Museum, in 2011 at the Houston Center for Contemporary Craft, and in 2013 at the Museum of Craft and Design in San Francisco.

== Death ==
Fisch died in San Diego on August 20, 2024, at the age of 92.

== Education ==
- 1952 B.S. in Art, Skidmore College, Saratoga Springs, New York
- 1954 M.A. in Art, University of Illinois at Urbana–Champaign
- 1956–57 Danish School of Arts and Crafts, Copenhagen
- 1957 Bernhard Hertz Guldvaerefabrik, Copenhagen
- 1959 Haystack Mountain School of Crafts, Liberty, Maine
- 1964 School for American Craftsmen, Rochester, New York
- 1966–67 University of Copenhagen and Apprentice School for Gold and Silversmiths, Copenhagen
- 1969 private study, Gabrielsen's Guldsmedie, Kolding, Denmark
- 1970 private study, Gilian Packard and Company, London, England
- 1971 private study, Stig Berg's Solvzmedie, Copenhagen, Denmark

== Honors and awards ==
- 1956 Fulbright Research Grant
- 1966 Fulbright Research Grant to Denmark
- 1975 National Endowment for the Arts Craftsman's Fellowship
- 1977 NEA Craftsman's Apprentice Grant
- 1979 NEA Craftsman's Workshop Grant (Project Director)
- 1981 NEA Services to the Field Project Grant
- 1982 Fulbright Grant, Lecturer, Vienna, Austria
- 1985 Declared a "Living Treasure of California" by Resolution of California State Assembly
- 1986 Distinguished Alumni Achievement Award, Skidmore College, Saratoga Springs, NY
- CSU Award for Research, Scholarship and Creative Activity
- 1989 Fulbright Grant, Lecturer, Montevideo, Uruguay
- 1990 Meritorious Performance and Professional Promise Award, SDSU
- 1994 Lifetime Achievement in the Crafts Award, National Museum of Women in the Arts, Washington, D.C.
- 1996 Outstanding Professor, San Diego State University
- 2000, Distinguished Educator's Award, James Renwick Alliance
- 2001 Gold Medal, American Craft Council
- 2002 Honorary Doctor of Humane Letters, Skidmore College
- 2003, Masters of the Medium, for Metal/Jewelry, James Renwick Alliance
- 2006, Fellowship award, United States Artists in support of her creative work
- 2012, Distinguished Woman Artist for 2012, Fresno Art Museum Council Of 100, with the exhibition, "In the Garden of Delight: Adornments by Arline Fisch," as a celebration.

== Professional ==
- Founding Member, Society of North American Goldsmiths (1969); president (1982-1985)
- Craftsman-Trustee, American Crafts Council (1972–1975)
- Board of Trustees, Haystack Mountain School of Crafts, Deer Isle, Maine (1973–1982; 1991–2000)
- Vice President for North America, World Crafts Council (1976–1981)
- Fellow of the American Crafts Council, Class of 1979
- Trustee, American Craft Council, (1994-2000)

== Publications ==
- Fisch, Arline M. (2000). Elegant fantasy : the jewelry of Arline Fisch. San Diego: San Diego Historical Society. ISBN 9783925369018. (English & German Edition: Stuttgart: Arnoldsche.)
- Fisch, Arline M. (2003). Textile techniques in metal : for jewelers, textile artists & sculptors (1st pbk. ed.). New York: Lark Books. ISBN 9781579905149.
- Fisch, Arline M. (2009). Crocheted wire jewelry : innovative designs & projects by leading artists. New York: Lark. ISBN 9781600594816. OCLC 317253475.

== Collections ==
- Kunstindustrimuseet, Oslo, Norway
- Museum of Fine Arts, Boston
- Museum of Applied Art, Trondheim, Norway
- Museum of Arts and Design, New York City
- National Museum of Modern Art, Kyoto, Japan
- National Museum of Scotland, Edinburgh, Scotland
- Racine Art Museum, Wisconsin
- Renwick Gallery of the Smithsonian American Art Museum, Washington, D.C.
- Vatican Museum, Rome
- Victoria & Albert Museum, London

== Archives ==
- A Finding Aid to the Arline M. Fisch Papers, 1931-2015, in the Archives of American Art, Smithsonian Institution
- An interview with Arline M. Fisch, conducted in 2001 July 29-30, by Sharon Church McNabb, for the Archives of American Art
