= Lunt Silversmiths =

American sterling and stainless steel manufacturer

Lunt Silversmiths was an American manufacturer of fine sterling, silver-plate and stainless steel flatware, holloware, and giftware established in 1902.

== History ==
In 1902, George C. Lunt, an engraver in the A .F. Towle & Son company, bought the business and renamed it Rogers, Lunt and Bowlen Co. The company has remained in the Lunt family hands since the founding.

In 1935, the name was changed to Lunt Silversmiths.

During World War II Lunt Silversmiths had a government contract to make yokes for airplanes used in the war effort. Many additional personnel were hired for quality control during this time.

Lunt's Embassy Scroll pattern was chosen by the United States government as its official tableware in all U.S. embassies and consulates around the world.

In late 2009, the company sold its name and inventory to competitor Reed & Barton.

In early 2010, the company filed for bankruptcy protection and all remaining manufacturing & inventory assets at the Greenfield, Massachusetts factory were sold at auction.
