= Grete Jalk =

Danish furniture designer (1920–2006)

- Born: 18 June 1920; Copenhagen
- Died: 14 January 2006 (aged 85)
- Occupations: Furniture designer, designer
- Notable work: GJ chair

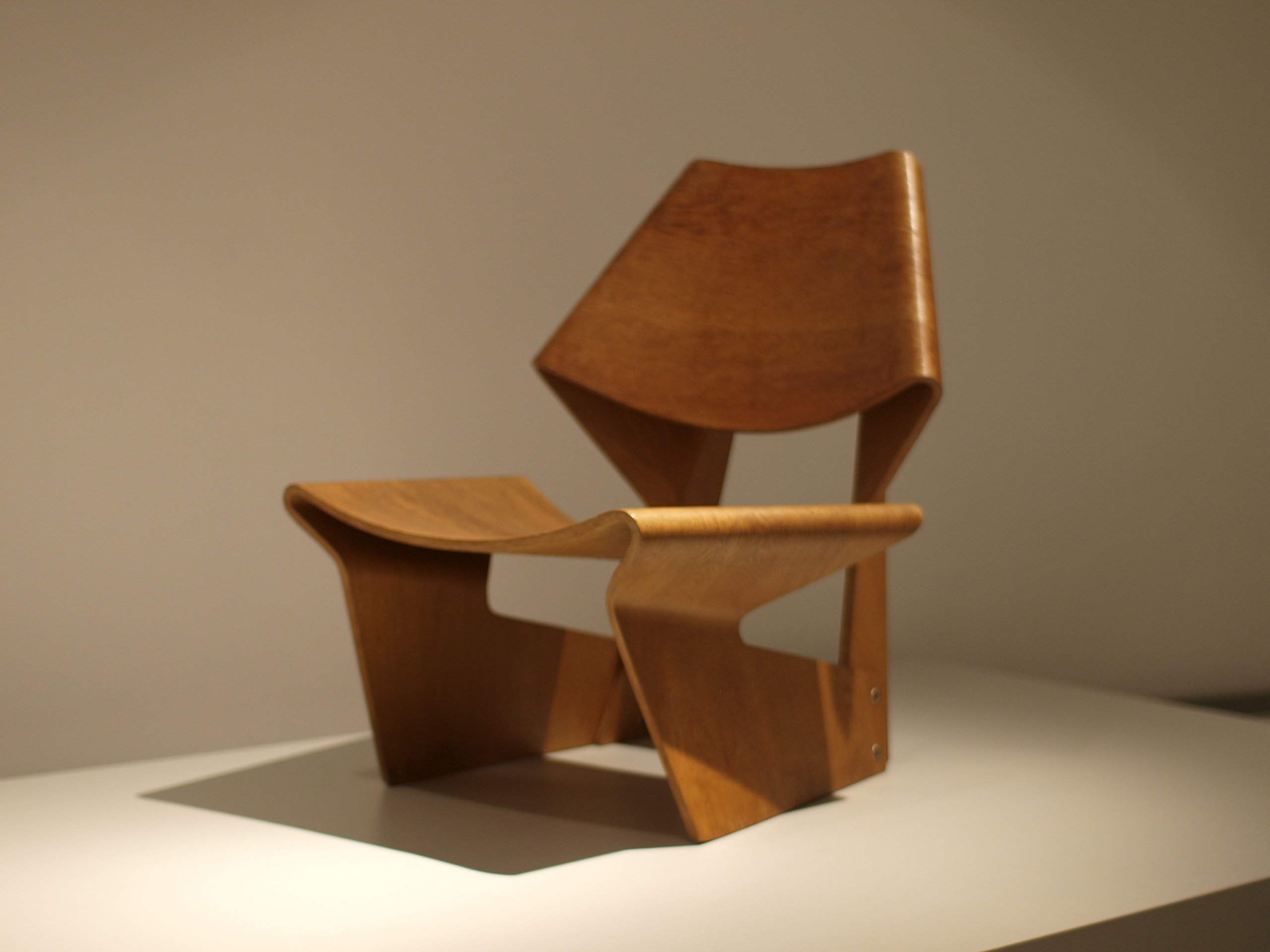
GJ Chair in laminated teak for Poul Jeppesen (1963)

Grete Jalk (18 June 1920 – 14 January 2006) was a Danish furniture designer. From the 1960s, she enhanced Denmark’s reputation for modern furniture design. She edited the Danish magazine Mobilia and compiled a four-volume work on Danish furniture.

== Early life ==
Born in Copenhagen, Jalk graduated from high school in modern languages and philosophy. She studied at the Design School for Women (1940–43) under cabinetmaker Karen Margrethe Conradsen and completed her training at the Danish Design School in 1946, with additional instruction from Kaare Klint at the Royal Academy’s Furniture School. She built connections with furniture designers, participated in annual competitions at the Design Museum and the Design School’s furniture department, and taught at the latter from 1950 to 1960.

== Furniture design ==
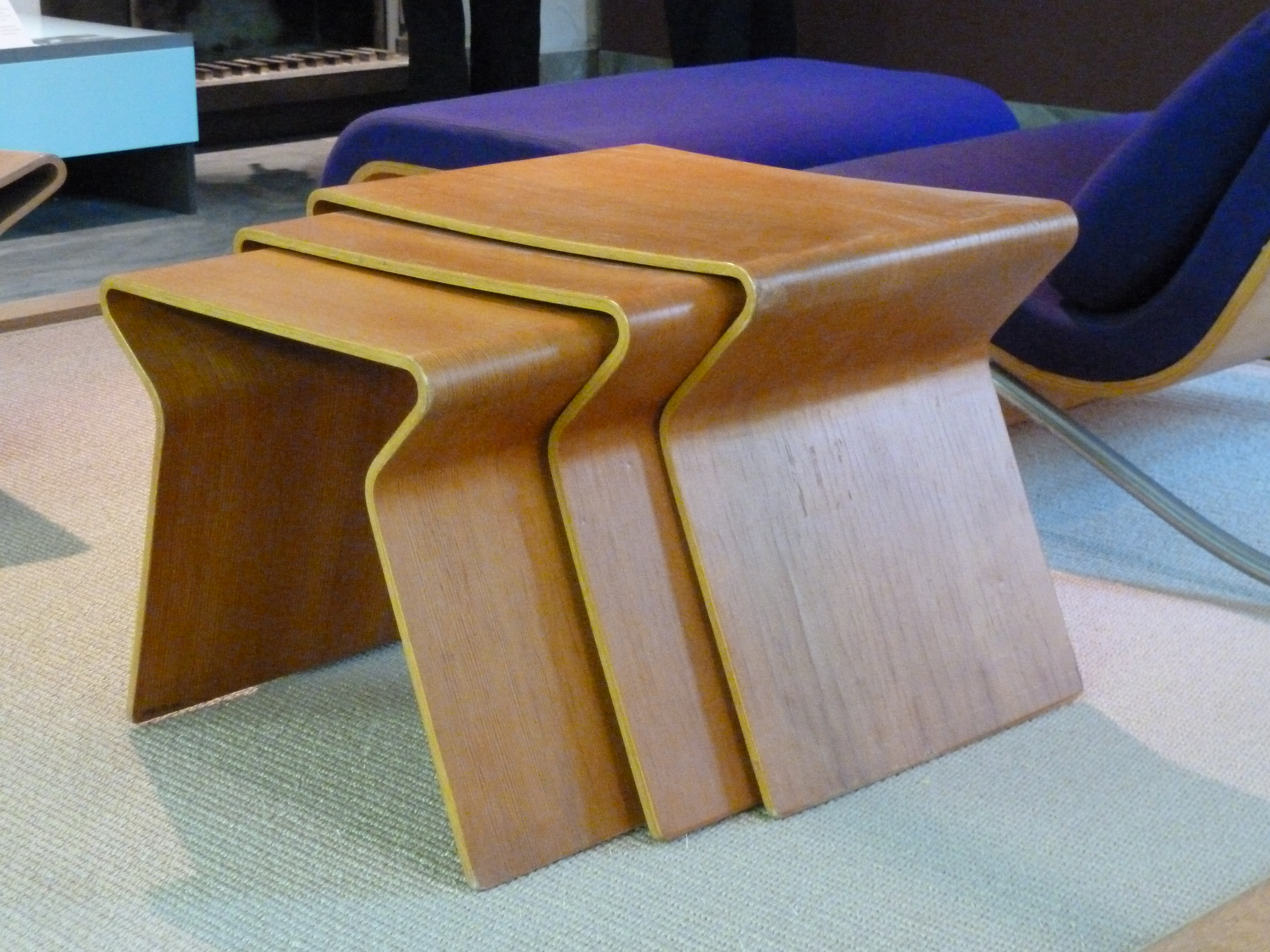
GJ Table (1963)

Jalk opened her design studio in 1953. Inspired by Alvar Aalto’s laminated bent-plywood furniture and Charles Eames’ moulded plywood designs, she created bold, curved models. Her unconventional designs gained slow recognition but appeared in exhibitions and collections. In 1963, the Daily Mail launched a competition for a man’s and a woman’s chair. Jalk won first prize with two laminated armchairs, the He Chair and She Chair, but they never entered full production. Her associate, cabinetmaker Poul Jeppesen, made prototypes, which a fire destroyed, halting the project. In 2008, Lange Production began industrial production of the She Chair. Jalk continued collaborating with Jeppesen, notably on a 1962 side chair in laminated plywood.

Jalk designed practical furniture for manufacturers, including a high desk and stool, Oregon pine shelves, and chairs with upholstered seats and backs on curved steel bases. Her designs, economical in materials, suited efficient production and boosted Denmark’s global reputation for furniture design. Firms in the United States and Finland produced some of her lines. Notable designs for modern homes include a wall-mounted storage system (1961), a living-room set with a coffee table (1962), and a “Watch and Listen” unit (1963) with compartments for a stereo, TV, records, tapes, and speakers. Her best-known works include laminated plywood furniture for Jeppesen, such as the 1962 side chair, and tubular steel furniture for Fritz Hansen, such as the 1964 easy chair. In 1963, she designed a moulded teak chair, the No. 9-1 or GJ Chair, using two plywood pieces bent into complex forms. Manufactured by Poul Jeppesen, that chair strengthened Scandinavia’s reputation for modern furniture. Jalk also designed wallpaper and upholstery for Unika Væv and silverware for Georg Jensen.

== Exhibition design ==
Jalk created exhibitions, including a 1974 travelling show for the Ministry of Foreign Affairs, displayed at 25 global venues. The project used cube-shaped corrugated-cardboard boxes with silkscreen texts and logos, doubling as stands, wall displays, showcases, and light fixtures with support rods. She designed the Designs by Danish Women exhibition at Copenhagen’s Bella Center for the 1980 UN Conference on Women.

== Literature ==
Jalk contributed to Danish furniture literature. She edited Mobilia, a furniture and interior design magazine, with Gunnar Bratvold from 1956 to 1962 and alone from 1968 to 1974 after Bratvold’s death. Her work led to a four-volume set on Danish furniture, considered a comprehensive resource.

- Grete Jalk, Dansk møbelkunst gennem 40 år – 40 years of Danish furniture design, 1987, Tåstrup: Teknologisk Instituts Forlag, 4 volumes: ISBN 87-7511-711-8, ISBN 87-7511-712-6, ISBN 87-7511-713-4, ISBN 87-7511-714-2.
