= Society of American Silversmiths =

The Society of American Silversmiths (SAS) is an American arts organization, founded in April 1989 and headquartered in Rhode Island. It is the nation's only professional organization devoted solely to the preservation and promotion of contemporary silversmithing.

== About ==
In addition to an outstanding benefits package, all members have access to the Society's technical and marketing expertise through its free consulting service to members. Its artisan members, those silversmiths who have been juried into the society based on their outstanding technical skill, and are provided with support, networking, and greater access to the market. The SAS Artisan member archive contains a maker's mark registry, over 1,400 slides and 400 photographs, and a resume for each artisan member. They have also offered silversmith classes and an apprenticeship program.

Through SAS, the public has access to a referral service that commissions silver holloware, flatware, and sculpture from its artisans.

== History ==
Jeffrey Herman is the founder of the Society of American Silversmiths. The SAS offered the Hans Christensen Sterling Silversmith's Award until 2006, a lifetime achievement award in silversmithing. The award was named after Hans Christensen (1924–1983), a metalsmith and a former professor at Rochester Institute of Technology (RIT).

In 2012, the SAS had 48 members.

== Notable people ==
- Henry Petzal
- John Prip
- Heikki Seppä
- Brooke Marks Swanson
- Linda Threadgill
- Valentin Yotkov
