= J. Fred Woell =

American metalsmith

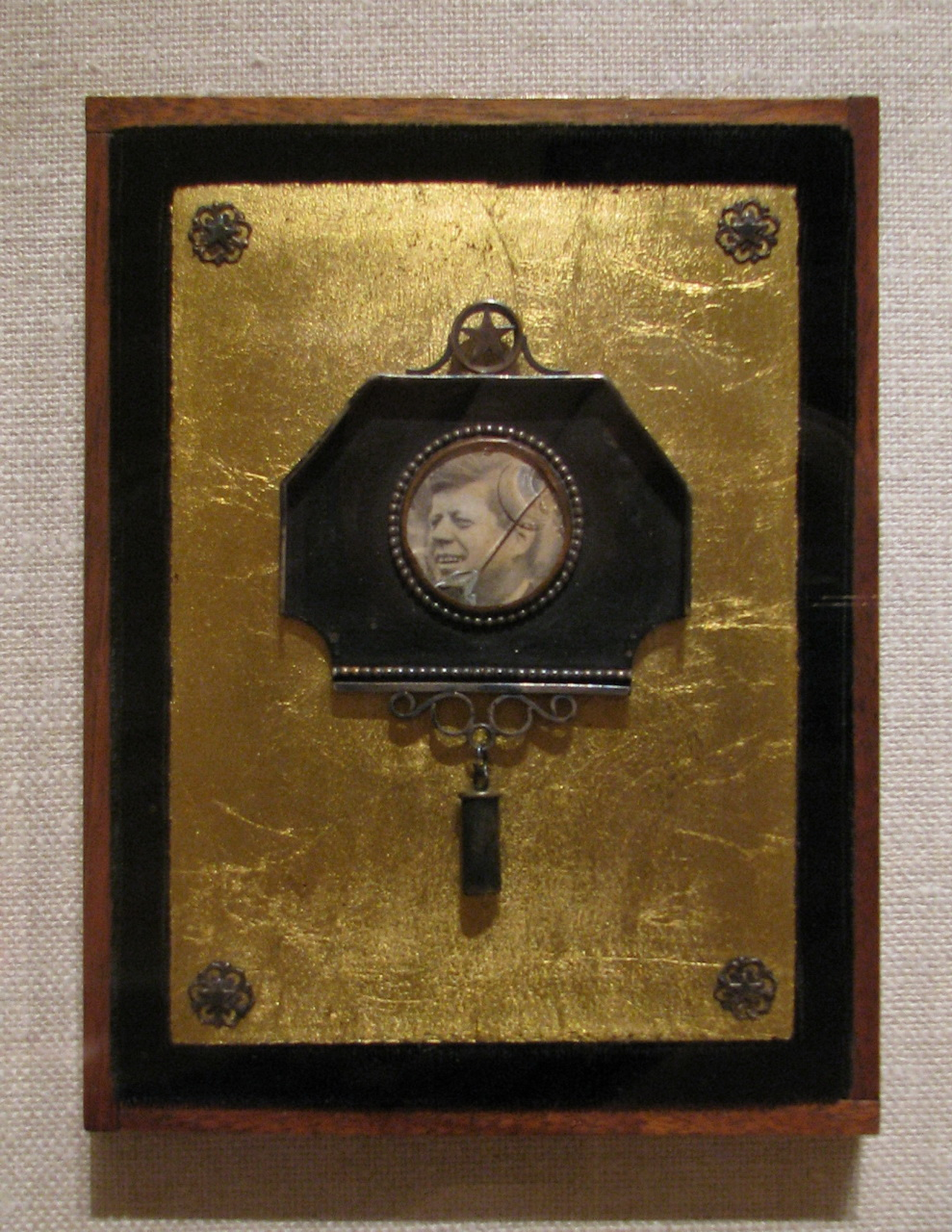
Piece created by J. Fred Woell in reference to the assassination of John F. Kennedy

James Frederick Woell, born in Evergreen Park, Illinois in 1934, was an American metalsmith who specialized in found object assemblages in his metal work. He received a degree in economics from the University of Illinois at Urbana-Champaign in 1956, and would later serve in the United States Army for two years. Upon returning to Illinois after his time in the military, Woell went back to Urbana-Champaign to pursue a BFA in art education. It was during this time that Woell was encouraged by his ceramics professor, Don Frith, to take a metals class at the school with metalsmith Robert Von Newman who, at the time, was considered to be one of the best in his field. Woell decided to take the class, and proceeded to enjoy it so much that he would attend the University of Wisconsin-Madison, something Neumann had recommended to him, and received his MFA in metalsmithing in 1962.

Upon his graduation from the University of Wisconsin-Madison, Woell taught for a short period of time. In 1967, he received a scholarship from Cranbook Academy of Art in Bloomfield Hills, Michigan to study sculpture and graduated in June 1969 with an MFA. Woell would once again teach, this time for four years at the University of Wisconsin School system, while he also had his first solo exhibition at the Museum of Contemporary Crafts and the Lee Nordness Gallery in New York. One of his more famous works that appeared at this exhibition was his piece titled, Come Alive, You're in the Pepsi Generation. The piece is made from silver, brass, steel, glass, and found objects, and features a photo of a woman with an open mouth smile mounted on a half circle object with the colors of Pepsi Cola as well as 5 small Pepsi bottle caps attached to it with chain and bullet shells. The result of Woell's solo exhibition was his work featured on magazine covers, television, and many other types of media. Woell describes this situation in his interview with Donna Gold, where he states, "...as a result of that show, a year later there was an article on me and my work in Craft Horizons magazine... now that did make quite an impact, and from then on I was asked to-it seemed like there was a whole series of magazine or books written on jewelry; they wanted a sample of something I did."

J. Fred Woell continued to teach for much of his life, and moved to Deer Isle, Maine to teach at the Haystack Mountain School of Crafts from 1973 to 2001. He also taught at Boston University, as well as the University of New York at New Paltz, prior to retirement in 2001. J. Fred Woell died in Deer Isle, Maine in 2015; he was 81.
