= John Prip =

Danish-American metalsmith

John Axel Prip
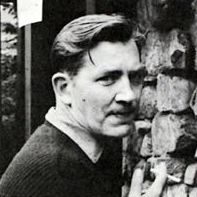
- Born: July 8, 1922; New York City, New York, U.S.
- Died: April 8, 2009 (aged 86); Roger Williams Hospital, Providence, Rhode Island, U.S.
- Other name: Jack Prip
- Spouse: Karen Elisabeth Brønnum Jensen (1927-1998)

John Axel Prip, also known as Jack Prip (1922–2009), was an American master metalsmith, industrial designer, and educator. He was known for setting standards of excellence in American metalsmithing. His works and designs have become famous for bringing together the formal, technical tradition of Danish design into harmony with the American desire for innovation. Several of his designs for the Reed and Barton Company are still in production today.

== Early childhood and education ==
Sterling silver Reed & Barton coffee service

Silver flatware set

Silver bowl with modernist base design

Amorphic martini pitcher with serving cups

John Prip was born on July 8, 1922, in New York City, of a Danish father Folmer Trolle Prip and an American mother Marian Evelyn Cherry. As a child, he moved to Denmark with his family, where his father ran a silversmithing factory that had been his grandfather's. Prip was a fourth generation metalsmith.

At age 15 in 1937, Prip began an apprenticeship with master silversmith Evald Nielsen, while attending high school. The next five years were spent polishing stakes, sweeping up, and laboriously reproducing classical renderings; the apprenticeship ended in 1942. He completed the required journeyman's piece, which was awarded silver medal/Hertz Award and he was awarded a diploma from Copenhagen Technical School. The apprenticeship experience taught diligence and a deeply rooted technical skill, but simultaneously imposed a restricted aesthetic. In a way it was the unlearning of these traditional forms and procedures that pushed the young silversmith into bold experiments and motivated the innovations that distinguished his career.

== Career ==
=== Alfred University ===
Following World War II in 1948, Prip returned to the United States with his family. He came over on the same boat with a woodworker named Tage Frid, who was to become a lifelong colleague and friend. They had both been invited to teach at Alfred University, in a new department called the School for American Craftsmen (SAC). At the time, there were few places to study and limited knowledge of metalsmithing techniques in the United States. Prip's position was unique: his Danish training provided him with firm technical grounding, while his American environment encouraged the attitude of exploration and innovation that became a hallmark of his career.

=== Rochester, New York ===
John Prip surrounded by students at the Rochester Institute of Technology

When the school moved to the Rochester Institute of Technology two years later, Jack and his family, which now included daughter Janet and son Peter, moved along with it. It was during this time in the early 1950s that Prip and the crafts movement were eagerly searching for their own style.

In 1953, Prip along with Ronald Hayes Pearson, Frans Wildenhain, Tage Frid, established a gallery in Rochester, New York called, Shop One. This gallery was a unique institution in its time, providing not only a business venture originated and managed by craftsmen, but also a forum for the presentation of top quality avant-garde craftwork. Its mission was to educate the public to the special beauty of handmade objects. In 1957, after three years with Shop One, Prip again felt the need to move on.

=== Reed and Barton Company ===
Through some fortunate connections he was hired by Reed and Barton Company, a holloware and flatware manufacturer in Massachusetts. The title invented for the role he conceived was Artist-Craftsman-Residence. He was given a workspace, materials, and access to the 900-worker factory. It was understood that Prip had a responsibility to address himself to work that might eventually profit the company, but beyond that guidance no restrictions were imposed. Prip was to stay at Reed and Barton for three years, leaving in 1960. One indication of his success there is the fact that 20 years later several of his designs are still in production.

=== Late career and Rhode Island School of Design ===
In 1971, he was a founding member of the Society of North American Goldsmiths. He was also a member of the Society of American Silversmiths.

Prip returned to teaching part-time at the School of the Museum of Fine Arts, Boston, from 1960 to 1962. In 1962, Prip taught at University of Southern California, Los Angeles (UCLA).

From 1963 until 1981, Prip taught at the Rhode Island School of Design.

== Death and legacy ==
Prip died in 2009 in Providence, Rhode Island. His daughter Janet Prip is a jeweler, sculptor, and metalsmith. His son, Peter, is also a metalsmith and was an adjunct faculty member at The Rhode Island School of Design for more than 30 years.

His work is in public museum collections including the Smithsonian American Art Museum, the Brooklyn Museum, the Art Institute of Chicago, Dallas Museum of Art, Museum of Fine Arts, Boston, the James A. Michener Art Museum, Minnesota Museum of American Art, and the Museum of Fine Arts, Houston.

== Selected exhibitions ==
- 2005: "Modernism in American Silver: 20th-Century Design," Dallas Museum of Art (traveled)
- 1988: "John Prip: Master Metalsmith", American Craft Museum (now Museum of Arts and Design), New York City, New York
- 1986: "Scandinavian Craft Today: Poetry of the Physical," American Craft Museum, New York City, New York (traveled)
- 1980: "For the Tabletop," American Craft Museum, New York, NY
- 1979: "Silver in American Life," Yale University Art Gallery (traveled through 1982)
- 1977: Philadelphia Museum of Art Invitational, PA
- 1975: "Forms in Metal-275 Years of Metalsmithing in America," Museum of Contemporary Crafts, New York, NY (travelled)
- 1974: "American Metalsmiths," Museum of Contemporary Crafts, New York, NY
- 1973: "'73 International Jewellery Arts Exhibition," Tokyo, Japan
- 1972: "John Prip/Metal," Museum of Contemporary Crafts, New York, NY
- 1971: "Holloware '71" Invitational, Fine Arts Gallery, State University of New York College at Brockport, Brockport, NY
- "Schmuck-Objekte, Goldschmiede Finden Neue Formen," Museum Bellerive, Zürich, Switzerland
- 1970: "Goldsmith '70" Invitational, Minnesota Museum of Art, St. Paul, MN (traveled) "Artists Craftsmen '70" Invitational
- 1969: "Objects: U.S.A. The Johnson Collection of Contemporary Crafts (traveled through 1972)
- 1968: Tyler Invitational, Temple University, Philadelphia, PA
- 1965: "The New England Silversmith," Museum of Art, Rhode Island School of Design, Providence, RI
- 1964: "30 Americans," Museum of Contemporary Crafts, New York, NY "The American Craftsman," Museum of Contemporary Crafts, New York, NY "Craftsmanship Defined," Philadelphia Museum College of Art, PA "Designed for Production: The Craftsman's Approach," Museum of Contemporary Crafts, New York, NY
- 1962: "A Craftsman's Role in Modern Industry: John Prip at Reed & Barton," Museum of Contemporary Crafts, New York, NY
- 1958: Museum of Contemporary Crafts, New York, NY United States Pavilion, Brussels World's Fair, Belgium
- 1956: "Craftsmanship in a Changing World," Museum of Contemporary Crafts, New York, NY Finger Lakes Annual, Rochester, NY (First Prize)
- 1955: Museum of Contemporary Crafts, New York, NY
- 1954: "American Designers," Museum of Modern Art, New York, NY Finger Lakes Annual, Rochester, NY (D'Amanda Award)
- 1953: "Designer Craftsmen, U.S.A. 1953," Brooklyn Museum, NY (traveled)
- 1952: Finger Lakes Annual, Rochester, NY (First Prize) 5th Annual Arts & Crafts Competition and Graphic Arts Exhibition, Los Angeles, CA (First Prize)
- 1949: 4th Annual Decorative Arts and Ceramics Exhibition, Wichita Art Association, KS (First Prize)

== Awards and honors ==
- 1992: gold medal for consummate craftsmanship from the American Craft Council
- 1986: awarded National Endowment for the Arts grant
- 1977: elected Fellow of the American Crafts Council
- 1968–1977: elected trustee, Performing and Visual Arts Society, New York City, New York
- 1964: featured artist/craftsman, New York World's Fair, sponsored by American Educational Council panel and participant, First World Congress of Craftsmen at Columbia University
- 1956: Lillian Fairchild Award for Creative Achievement, Memorial Art Gallery, Rochester, NY Juror: "Midwest Designer/Craftsmen," Milwaukee, WI
