= Towle Silversmiths =

American silver manufacturer

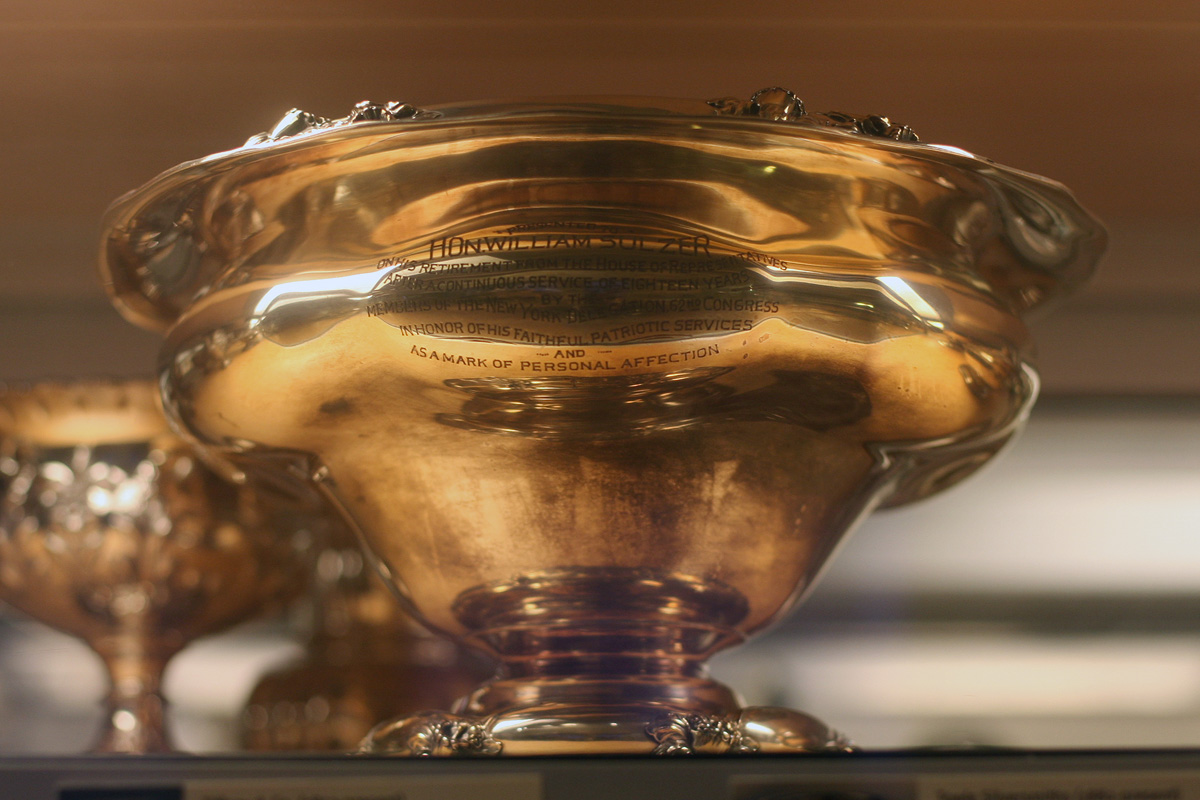
Punch bowl by Towle Silversmiths, c. 1912

Towle Silversmiths is an American silver manufacturer.

Towle Silversmiths was founded in 1690 by William Moulton II, the first silversmith in Newbury, Mass. Moulton's family continued to operate the shop, and in 1857 apprentices Anthony Francis Towle and William P. Jones incorporated their work as Towle & Jones. In 1873 it became A.F. Towle & Son, and then in 1882, Anthony Francis Towle established the Towle Manufacturing Co. while still owning A.F. Towle & Son. In 1890, the company adopted the trademark of a large script "T" enclosing a lion. Richard Dimes, an English silversmith who had immigrated to the U.S. in 1881, started Towle's hollowware line. Dimes, who also worked for the Frank W. Smith Silver Co., would independently establish Richard Dimes Co. in Boston. Ultimately, the company's name was changed to Towle Silversmiths.

Over the years, Towle has created numerous sterling silver flatware patterns in the United States: including the "Candlelight" in 1934, the "Marie Louise" in 1939, which became the official sterling silver pattern for U.S. embassies worldwide, and "Old Master" in 1942, now considered by some to be the company's flagship pattern. "Contour" in 1950 (designed by Robert J. King, patented by John Van Koert) was the first American sterling pattern to manifest post-World War II organic modernist design and the only production-line American flatware included in the Museum of Modern Art's Good Design exhibitions.

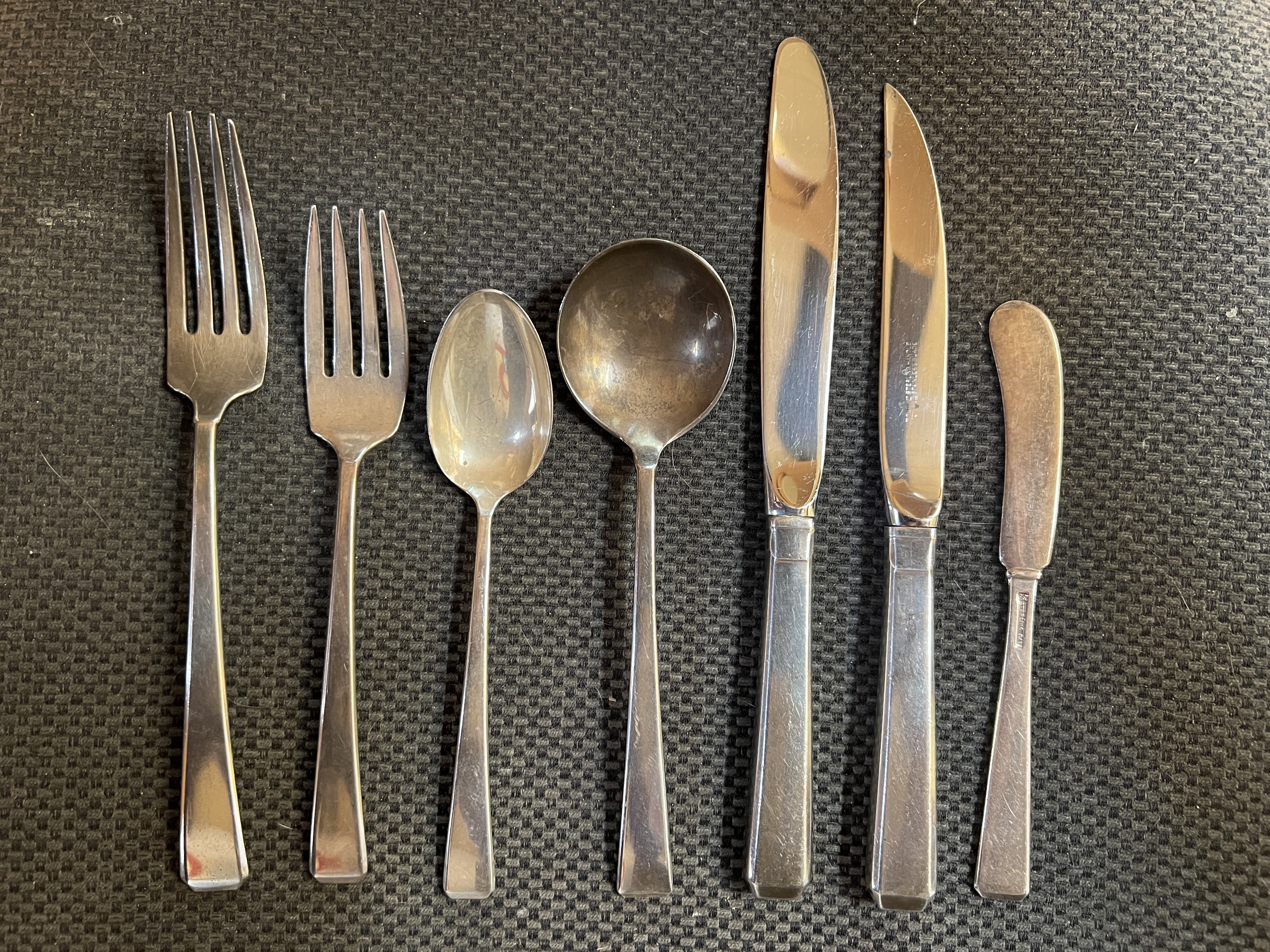
Silverware from Towle Silversmiths' "Craftsman" line

The company expanded after a series of acquisitions in the late 1970s and early 1980s. In 1986, due to problems with inventory and distribution and a weak retail market, Towle filed for Chapter 11 bankruptcy protection.

In 1990, Towle Silversmiths was acquired by the holding company Syratech Inc., which also owned Wallace Silversmiths and the International Silver Company. In 2006, Lifetime Brands Inc. purchased Syratech Inc., acquiring all three brands.
