= Brininstool + Lynch =

Brininstool + Lynch, Ltd.
- Company type: S Corporation
- Industry: Architecture
- Founded: 1989
- Founder: David Brininstool; Brad Lynch
- Headquarters: Chicago, IL, USA
- Services: Architecture; Planning; Interiors; Furniture/Product Design
- Number of employees: 33
- Website: brininstool-lynch.com

Brininstool + Lynch, Ltd. is a Chicago-based architecture firm named for partners David Brininstool and Brad Lynch. Founded in 1989, the 33-person firm offers architecture, planning, interior and product design services. The firm is known for its modern design aesthetic. Brininstool + Lynch has received awards for multiple projects including Wood House in Chicago, an office for Enova, an online financial services company, and Racine Art Museum in Racine, Wisconsin. Currently, they are working on a mixed-use residential project in Toronto which is an adaptive reuse of existing waterfront silos. In 2013, Brininstool + Lynch moved to its current location in the West Loop into a building which was originally designed by them in 2001 for a previous client.

== Representative projects ==
=== Single-family residential ===
- Wood House, Chicago, IL (2013)
- Coffou Apartment, Chicago, IL (2010)
- Coffou Cottage, Michigan City, IN (2008)
- Claremont House, Chicago, IL (2007)
- Carus Residence, Peru, IL (2003)
- Thompson House, Chicago, IL (1996)

=== Multi-family residential ===
- 710 W. Grand, Chicago, IL (2018)
- Catalyst, Chicago, IL (2014)
- R+D 659, Chicago, IL (2009)
- 550 St. Clair, Chicago, IL (2008)
- 1720 S. Michigan, Chicago, IL (2007)
- 1620 S. Michigan, Chicago, IL (2006)
- 321 S. Sangamon, Chicago, IL (2004)

=== Commercial and interiors ===
- Sterling Partners, Chicago, IL (2012)
- Enova 9th Floor, Chicago, IL (2012)
- Basecamp, Chicago, IL (2010)
- United Airlines Red Carpet Club, O'Hare International Airport, Chicago, IL (2008)
- Tiny Lounge, Chicago, IL (2008)

=== Museums/institutional ===
- Lincoln Building, Syracuse, NY (2010)
- Racine Art Museum, Racine, WI (2003)
- Perimeter Gallery, New York, NY (2001)
- Perimeter Gallery, Chicago, IL (1996)

== Selected awards ==
=== American Institute of Architects – Chicago ===
- Divine Detail Award, Honor Award for Wood House, Chicago, IL (2018)
- Interior Architecture Award, Honor Award for Wood House, Chicago, IL (2015)
- Interior Architecture Award, Citation of Merit for Enova 9th Floor, Chicago, IL (2013)
- Sustainability Leadership Award, Citation of Merit for the Lincoln Building, Syracuse, NY (2012)
- Distinguished Building Award, Citation of Merit for the Coffou Cottage, Michigan City, IN (2010)
- Divine Detail Award, Citation of Merit for the Claremont House, Chicago, IL (2009)
- Distinguished Building Award, Citation of Merit for the Claremont House, Chicago, IL (2008)
- Interior Architecture Award, Honor Award for the Claremont House, Chicago, IL (2008)
- Distinguished Building Award, Citation of Merit for 1620 S. Michigan, Chicago, IL (2007)
- Interior Architecture Award, Citation of Merit for the Carus Residence, Peru, IL (2006)
- Distinguished Building Award, Honor Award for the Carus Residence, Peru, IL (2005)
- Divine Detail Award, Honor Award for the Racine Art Museum, Racine, WI (2005)
- Sustainable Design Award, Special Recognition for Downtown Revitalization for the Racine Art Museum, Racine, WI (2004)
- Distinguished Building Award, Citation of Merit for the Racine Art Museum, Racine, WI (2003)
- Interior Architecture Award, Honor Award for the Racine Art Museum, Racine, WI (2003)

=== Residential architect ===
- Residential Architect Design Award (Custom Home / Over 3,000 Square Feet) for Wood House, Chicago, IL (2014)
- Residential Architect Design Award (Custom House) for the Coffou Cottage, Michigan City, IN (2010)
- Residential Architect Design Award (Custom House) for the Claremont House, Chicago, IL (2010)
- Residential Architect Design Award (Design Detail) for the Claremont House, Chicago, IL (2010)
