= Hans Christensen (silversmith) =

Danish-born American silversmith (1924–1983)

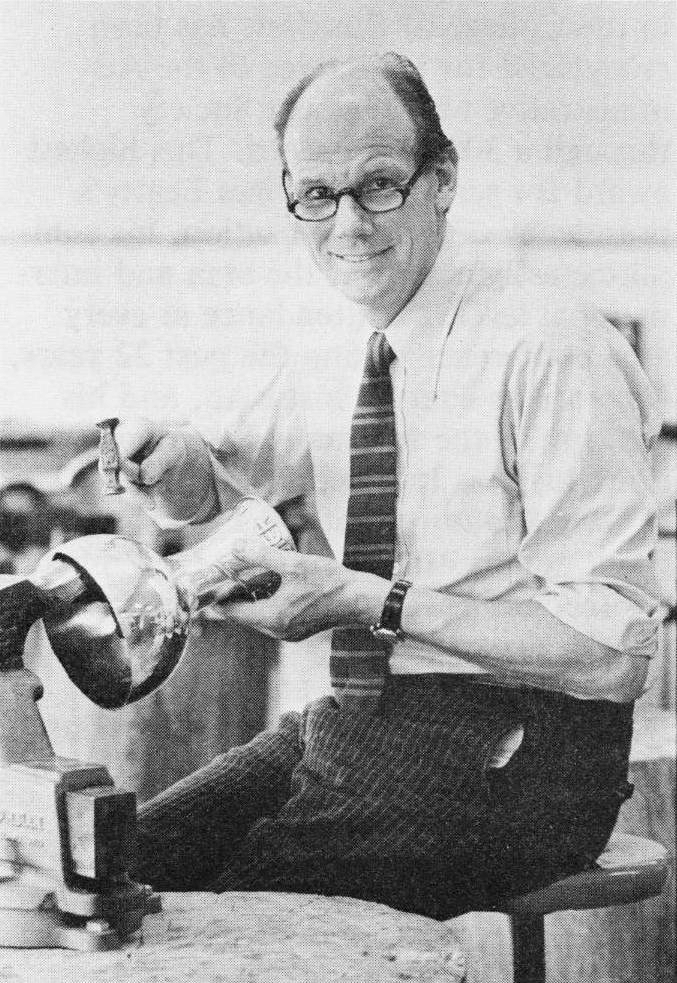
- Born: Hans Jørgen Thorvald Christensen; January 21, 1924; Copenhagen, Denmark
- Died: January 16, 1983 (aged 58); Henrietta, New York, U.S.
- Occupations: Master silversmith, metalsmith, jeweler, designer, educator
- Employer: Rochester Institute of Technology
- Spouse(s): Astrid Elizabeth "Betten" Sandum (m. 1953–1965; divorce); Elizabeth "Els" Meijer (m. 1968–1983; death)

Hans Jørgen Thorvald Christensen (1924–1983) was a Danish-born American master silversmith, metalsmith, jeweler, designer, and educator. In the second half of the 20th century, he was a major contributor to handcrafted silver design in the United States.

Christensen taught at Rochester Institute of Technology for many years and held the Charlotte Fredericks Mowris Professorship in Contemporary Crafts. In 1979, he was honored as a Fellow of the American Craft Council. He is the namesake of the Society of American Silversmiths' Hans Christensen Sterling Silversmith's Award.

== Early life and education ==
Hans Jørgen Thorvald Christensen was born on January 21, 1924, in Copenhagen, Denmark, to parents Valborg (née Makkenbol) and Holger Christensen.

He attended the Tegne- og Kunstindustriskolen (English: Arts and Crafts School; now known as Danmarks Designskole) in Copenhagen and the National School for Arts and Crafts (Norwegian: Statens håndverks- og kunstindustriskole; now known as Norwegian National Academy of Craft and Art Industry) in Oslo.

== Career ==
Christensen started his career early in 1939, when he worked at Georg Jensen Sølvsmedie (English: Georg Jensen Silversmithy), lasted there for 10 years. In 1944, he completed his basic apprenticeship with a journeyman’s project. Christensen created a notable silver tea pot, which received two silver medallion awards from King Frederik IX of Denmark.

In 1954, Christensen immigrated to the United States to teach metalsmithing and jewelry making at Rochester Institute of Technology (RIT) in Rochester, New York. John Prip had recommended Christensen for the job role. Christensen worked at RIT until his death in 1983. He had many notable students, including silversmith William Nicholas Frederick (1921–2012).

He died in a car accident on January 16, 1983, in Henrietta, New York. Christensen's work can be found in various collections including the Vatican Museums papal art collection, and in multiple collections for European royal families.

== Personal life ==
From 1953 to 1965, Christensen was married to Astrid Elizabeth "Betten" Sandum. From 1968 until 1983, the time of his death, Christensen was married to Elizabeth "Els" Meijer.
