= John Van Koert =

American designer

John Owen Van Koert
- Born: July 20, 1912; Minneapolis, Minnesota, United States
- Died: October 11, 1998 (aged 86); Santa Fe, New Mexico
- Known for: Danish modern design

John "Jack" Van Owen Koert (July 20, 1912 – October 11, 1998) was an American designer and artist best known for his mid-century modern furniture lines for Drexel Furniture and for promoting Danish modern design.

== Life ==
John Van Koert was born on July 3, 1912, in Minneapolis, Minnesota, to John Henry Van Kort and Eleanor Owen. In 1916 the family moved to Calgary, Alberta, Canada. The family moved to Shorewood, Wisconsin, in 1923.

He attended the University of Wisconsin-Madison to study art and sculpture and graduated in 1934. He was elected as lieutenant commander of the Gamma Lambda chapter of the Sigma Nu fraternity in 1932. He joined the faculty there in 1936 and taught art until his enlistment in the army.

Van Koert enlisted as a private in the United States Army for World War II on 3 August 1942. Later, as a staff sergeant, he was known to teach art classes at Camp Davis, North Carolina, and somewhat humorously advertised that a model would be present for the class which, to the apparent disappointment of the attendees, turned out to be a soldier in full gear. After being discharged from the US Army, he did not return to the University of Wisconsin.

After the war, Van Koert moved to New York city to practice metalware design and worked for Towle Silversmiths from 1949 to 1954.

Van Koert died a stroke on October 11, 1998 in Sante Fe, New Mexico, with no immediate survivors. He had no siblings or children.

== Art ==
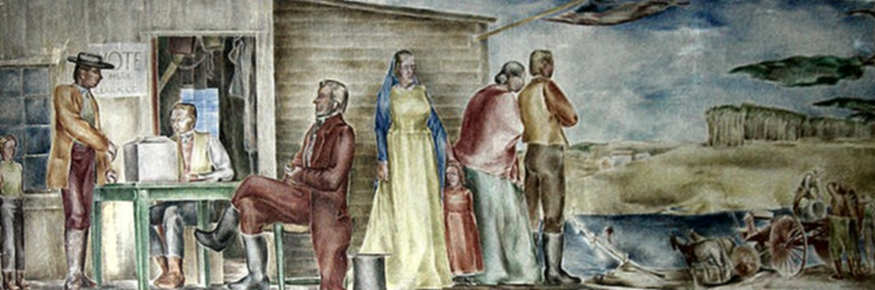
The Choosing of the County Seat, by John Van Koert, 1940

His first exhibit as an artist was as an undergraduate student at the University of Wisconsin. Three of his artworks, Malt House, Barn, and Still Life, were chosen for hanging display in the Class of '30 Trust Art contest in 1932.

Van Koert joined the faculty at the University in 1935 or 1936. Jack made summer trips in 1936 and 1938 to France and England to survey new art materials and painting styles.

In 1937, his oil work Campus Scene received a purchase prize at the Wisconsin Painters Show in the Wisconsin Art Institute. A number of his works were chosen for display at the Fifth Wisconsin Salon of Art in 1938. His new media Gouache works, Student at Stairways, Two Students, Bathers, and Restaurant were exhibited. Also included were his oil paintings Bascom Hall Bubbler and Corner Store Grocery, an etching Central Park and a lithograph Rirverside Bridge.

His work The Choosing of the County Seat was a mural painted in 1940 above the postmaster’s door at the Neillsville, Wisconsin Post Office. The painting was a part of the Federal Art Project.

Two of Van Kort's work are in the collection of the Madison Museum of Contemporary Art, Concert and Two Girls in Railroad Coach.

== Silverwork ==
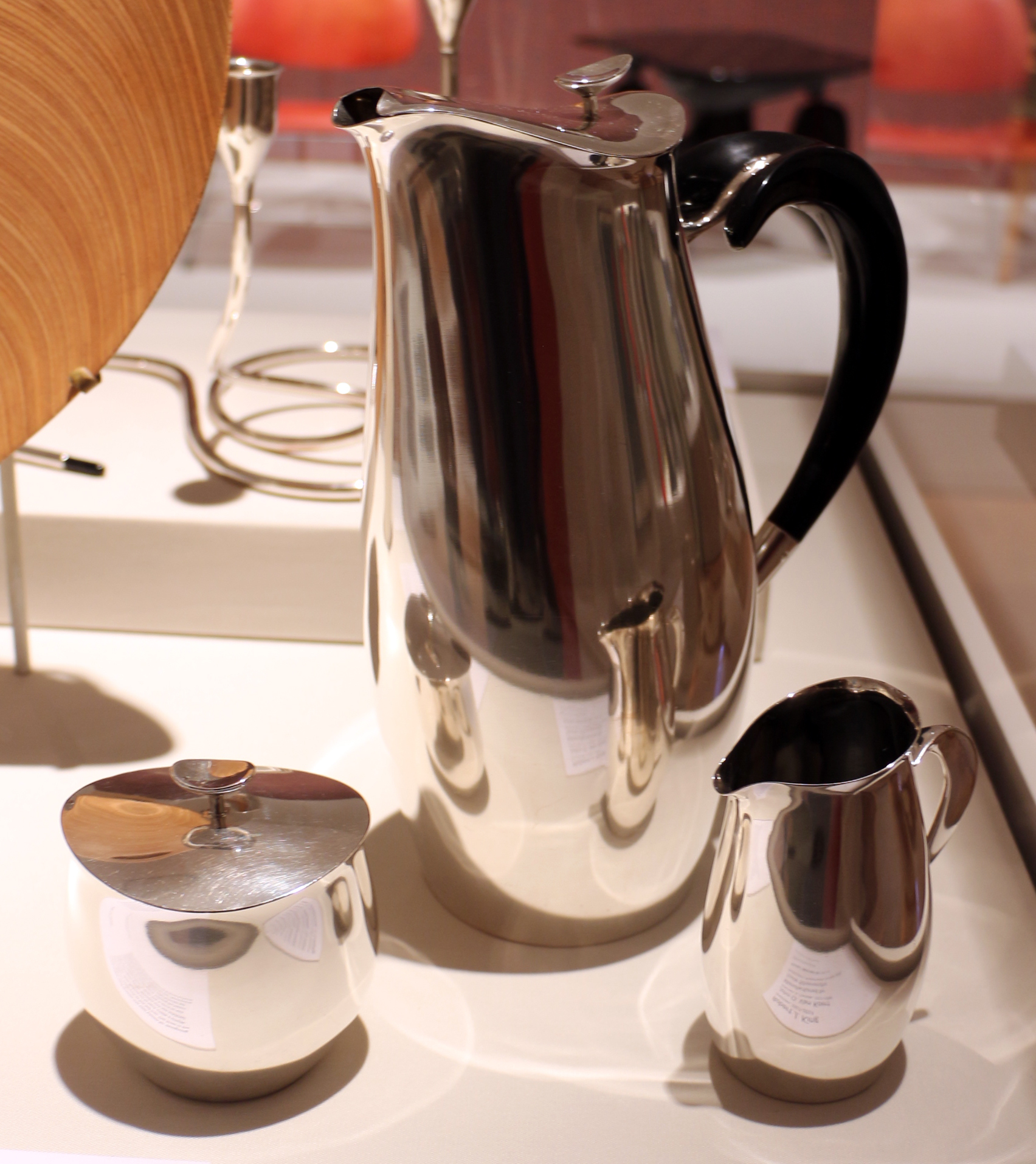
Contour beverage service

Examples of Van Koert's flatware designs are in the collection of the Philadelphia Museum of Art. An example of silver service set he designed while at Towle Silversmiths is listed in Museum of Fine Arts, Boston collection.

== Furniture ==
Van Koert began his relationship with Drexel Funiture in 1954 with the collaboration resulting in a number of very popular and influential series, in particular the Profile and Projection series, there also being some overlap in the esthetics of the two lines.

Drexel's Casa del Sol (home in the sun) Spanish influenced furniture line was introduced in June, 1957. The collection included nearly 80 pieces for the bedrooms, living rooms and dining rooms.

The Designer furniture line was introduced in 1964 at the International Home Furnishings Market in Chicago, Illinois.

== Patents ==
From 1951 to 1982, John Van Koert filed more than 40 design patens for his work.

1. U.S. patent D161720 - Design for a Fork or Similar Article - 1951
2. U.S. patent D164210 - Knife or similar article - 1951
3. U.S. patent D166723 - Serving Knife Blade or Similar Article - 1952
4. U.S. patent D167490 - Fork or similar article -1952
5. U.S. patent D172570 - Fork or the like - 1953
6. U.S. patent D172850 - Pitcher or the like - 1954
7. U.S. patent D172851 - Cream pitcher or the like - 1954
8. U.S. patent D172852 - Condiment dispenser or the like - 1954
9. U.S. patent D172853 - Sugar bowl ob the like - 1954
10. U.S. patent D175658 - Candle holder or the like - 1955
11. U.S. patent D177157 - Dresser or similar article of furniture - 1956
12. U.S. patent D177158 - Chest or similar article of furniture - 1956
13. U.S. patent D177159 - Chest or similar article of furniture - 1956
14. U.S. patent D178092 - Bench or similar article of furniture - 1956
15. U.S. patent D178093 - Extension table - 1956
16. U.S. patent D178094 - Drop leaf extension table
17. U.S. patent D178095 - Side chair
18. U.S. patent D178096 - Arm chair
19. U.S. patent D178097 - Desk - 1956
20. U.S. patent D178098 - Coffee table - 1956
21. U.S. patent D178099 - Coffee table - 1956
22. U.S. patent D178100 - Chair - 1956
23. U.S. patent D178163 - Drawer handle or the like - 1956
24. U.S. patent D178621 - Table - 1956
25. U.S. patent D178851 - Bedstead - 1956
26. U.S. patent D178939 - Headboard for beds - 1956
27. U.S. patent D251693 - Female mannequin or the like - 1979
28. U.S. patent D252562 - American beaver sculpture or the like - 1979
29. U.S. patent D252770 - Billard table or the like - 1979
30. U.S. patent D253432 - Combined hurricane lamp and centerpiece or the like - 1979
31. U.S. patent D253732 - Combined candleholder and centerpiece or the like - 1979
32. U.S. patent D254527 - Mirror frame or the like - 1980
33. U.S. patent D255629 - Table or the like - 1980
34. U.S. patent D255630 - Open cabinet or the like - 1980
35. U.S. patent D255078 - Mirror or the like - 1980
36. U.S. patent D255746 - Mirror frame or the like - 1980
37. U.S. patent D256529 - Hanging magazine rack or the like - 1980
38. U.S. patent D256531 - Cabinet or the like - 1980
39. U.S. patent D259731 - Jig saw puzzle or the like - 1981
40. U.S. patent D260979 - Figurine or the like - 1981
41. U.S. patent D260980 - Bird statuette or the like - 1981
42. U.S. patent D264286 - Household storage rack or similar article - 1982
