= Ronald Hayes Pearson =

American designer, jeweler (1924–1996)

- Born: September 22, 1924; New York City, New York, US
- Died: August 25, 1996 (aged 71); Deer Isle, Maine, US
- Education: University of Wisconsin, Alfred University
- Known for: design, jewelry, metalsmith
- Spouse(s): Ruth Kathleen (Kay) Harris, Carolyn A. Hecker
- Children: 6

Ronald Hayes Pearson (September 22, 1924 – August 25, 1996) was an American designer, jeweler, and metalsmith. He lived for many years in Rochester, New York and later, Deer Isle, Maine.

== Biography ==
Ronald Hayes Pearson was born on September 22, 1924, in New York City, New York to parents Louise Hayes Pearson and Ralph M. Pearson (1883–1958), an accomplished American etcher-art teacher/critic. In his early childhood, the family took visits to a Danish American metalsmith art colony at Milton-on-the-Hudson, called Elverhoj. (Hill of the faeries). He attended University of Wisconsin from 1942 to 1943, for political science, followed by service in the United States Merchant Marine from 1943 to 1947. Following the service, he attended the School for American Craftsmen at Alfred University/RIT (1947–1948). In 1949, he also enrolled in Reed and Barton Silver Company's Special Design Program.].

Around the age of 12 Pearson was exposed to metalwork on his family's barge/art school. In 1948, he opened a studio, in a former chicken coop, in Alfred, NY. His first works were metal spinning. Mostly spun, hollow, bronze, works. Taking an interest in jewelry, his first piece received a first-place award in competition.

In 1953, realizing there were limited outlets to sell his works, Pearson, along with metalsmith John Prip, cabinetmaker Tage Frid, and ceramist Frans Wildenhain opened Shop One in Rochester, NY. At the time, the only outlet in the United States, other than America House in Manhattan, NY, that exclusively sold one-of-a-kind, handmade, works of arts and crafts.

Pearson, Frid, Prip and Wildenhain also took steps at Shop One to make it easier for people to visualize what the pieces would look like in their homes. (a connection between the artist, the piece, and purchaser) Both Shop One and The America House launched the Craft Movement.

In 1971, following a separation from his wife, and mother to 4 of his children, Kay (Kathleen) Pearson, Pearson moved to Deer Isle, Maine where he set up a studio. Until his death in 1996, Pearson ran his studio, at times with several other craftspeople, helping produce his works. He also had a hand in teaching craftspeople either at his studio or at Haystack Mountain School of Crafts and was a mentor to many up-and-coming craftspeople.

The Maine College of Art awarded him an honorary degree in 1987. He was awarded in 1996 the American Craft Council's highest honor, the gold medal.

== Personal ==
Mr. Pearson, married Ruth Kathleen (Kay) Harris from Charlton, Massachusetts. Kay had a supporting role in the success of Shop One when it opened, sewing Marimekko dresses, making weed cards and entertaining guest artists while raising 4 children. They later divorced. Pearson later remarried to Caroline Hecker, who he'd met at the Greenwood Gallery in Washington, DC. (Part of the Smithsonian) They had no children together. Mr. Pearson had 4 children with Kay Pearson, adopting a son from Kay's prior marriage. He fathered two other children, one of whom died young. He was married, shortly, two additional times. Ron was an avid sailor and could often be found smoking his pipe while piloting his Herreshoff Rozinante sailboat through Eggemoggin Reach and Frenchman's Bay, Maine.

== Death and legacy ==
Ron died, at his home on Deer Isle, Maine, on August 25, 1996, from esophageal cancer. His legacy is substantial. Besides having taught metalcrafts at some of the most prestigious schools/art centers in the United States and being one of the most influential metalsmiths in the country, he was a founding member of the Society of North American Goldsmiths, he designed flatware for the Kirk Steiff Company, he was certified by CETA to train people as jewelers. Other honors include Louis Comfort Tiffany Foundation grant (1969) National Endowment for the Arts Fellowship (1973,'78) trustee, Haystack Mountain School of Crafts (1988–94) honorary doctorate, Maine School of Art (1987) and, in 1996, he was awarded The American Craft Council's highest honor, the gold medal. His works can be seen at the Smithsonian American Arts Museum, the American Craft Museum, the Museum of Modern Art, the Cooper Hewitt, Smithsonian Design Museum, among others.
