= Stanley Lechtzin =

American jeweler (born 1936)

Stanley Lechtzin (born 1936) is an American artist, jeweler, metalsmith and educator. He is noted for his work in electroforming and computer aided design (CAD) and computer aided manufacture (CAM). He has taught at Temple University in the Tyler School of Art and Architecture, from 1962.

== Early life and education ==
Stanley was born in 1936 in Detroit, Michigan, to an observant Jewish family. He first encountered jewelry and metalsmithing at Cass Technical High School. After high school Lechtzin worked as a draftsman and cartographer. While working for the City of Detroit Public Lighting Commission he realized that he did not want to continue that career path, so he began taking night courses at Wayne State University in Detroit. He set up a studio and began taking commissions upon graduation. He soon entered the Cranbrook Academy of Art, where much of his graduate work dealt with ferrous metals and stainless steel flatware.

== Career ==
Upon graduation from Cranbrook Academy of Art, Lechtzin accepted a teaching position in 1962 at Tyler School of Art at Temple University in Philadelphia, Pennsylvania. Lechtzin was one of nine founding members of the Society of North American Goldsmiths. In 2009, he was awarded the SNAG Lifetime Achievement Award.

His work can be found in public museum collections including at the Museum of Arts and Design, the Cooper-Hewitt Museum, Smithsonian American Art Museum, Metropolitan Museum of Art, Yale University Art Gallery, and the Philadelphia Museum of Art.

== Solo exhibitions ==
Select list of solo exhibitions

- 2009: The Philadelphia Art Alliance
- 1984: The University of Pittsburgh Art Gallery
- 1984: Southern Alleghenies Museum of Art (Loretto, PA)
- 1984: William Penn Museum (Harrisburg, PA)
- 1984: The Works Gallery (Philadelphia)
- 1973: Tyler School of Art, Temple University
- 1973: Goldsmiths' Hall (London, England)
- 1969: Boston Museum School (Boston, Mass.)
- 1969: Ball State University (Muncie, Indiana)
- 1969: Lee Nordness Galleries (New York, NY)
- 1968: William Penn Museum (Harrisburg, PA)
- 1967: University of California (Berkeley, CA)
- 1966: Pennsylvania State University (State College, PA)
- 1965: Museum of Contemporary Crafts (New York, NY)
- 1963: Art Center, Kalamazoo Institute of Arts (Michigan)
- 1962: Carnegie Institute of Technology (Pittsburgh, PA.)
