= Danmarks Designskole =

Art school in Copenhagen, Denmark

Coordinates: 55°40′59.64″N 12°36′15.92″E

Royal Danish Academy
- Det Kongelige Akademi
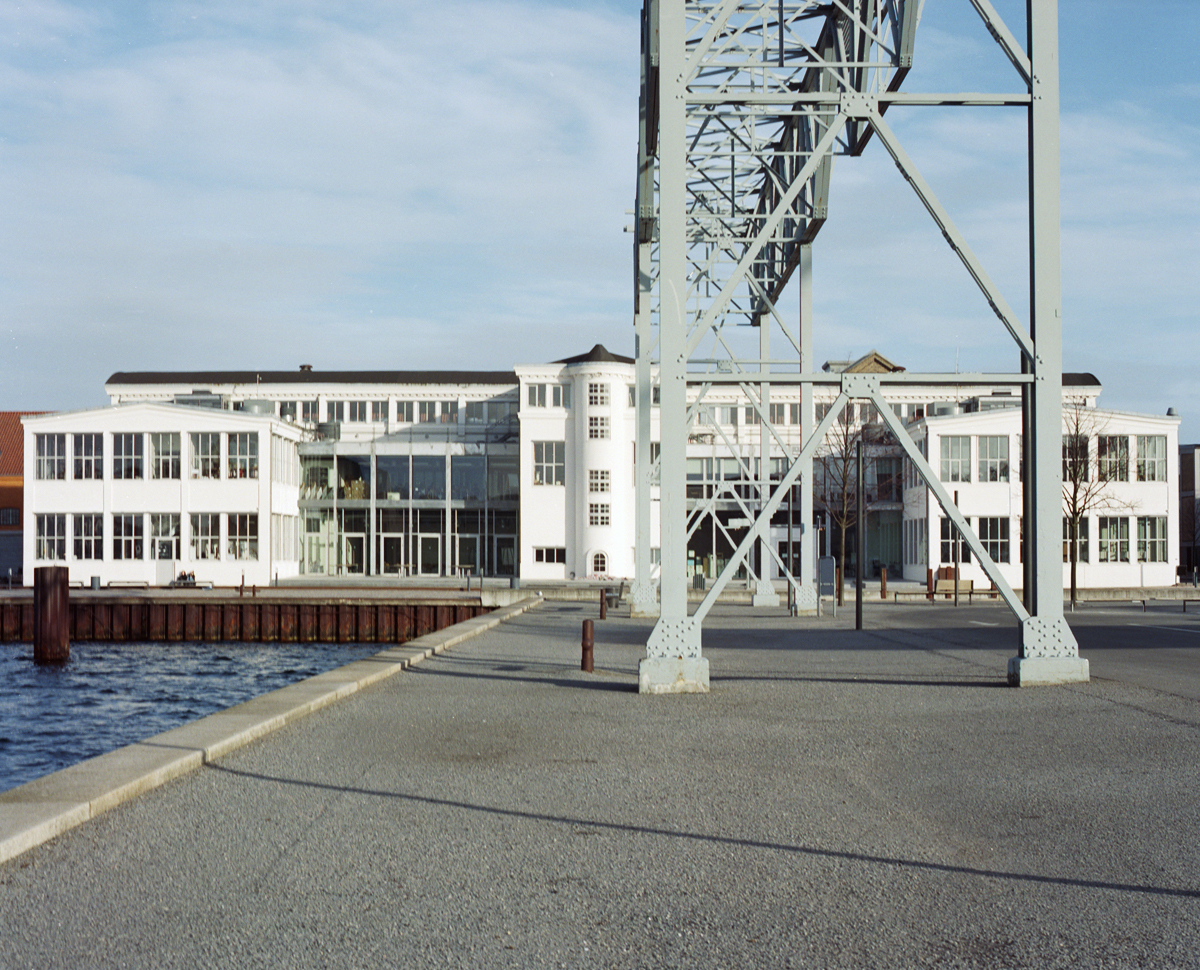
- Other names: DKDS
- Former names: Arts and Crafts School; The School of Arts and Crafts; The Danish Design School
- Established: 1875
- Parent institution: Royal Danish Academy of Fine Arts
- Dean: Lene Dammand Lund
- Students: 650
- Location: Copenhagen, Denmark
- Campus: Holmen
- Website: Royal Danish Academy

The Royal Danish Academy of Fine Arts, School of Design (Danish: Det Kongelige Akademi), more commonly known as the Danish Design School (Danish: Danmarks Designskole, DKDS) is an institution of higher education in Copenhagen, Denmark, offering a five-year design education consisting of a three-year Bachelor programme and a two-year Master in design as well as conducting research within the fields of arts, crafts and design. Danmarks Designskole is an institution under the Ministry of Science, Innovation and Higher Education.

== History ==
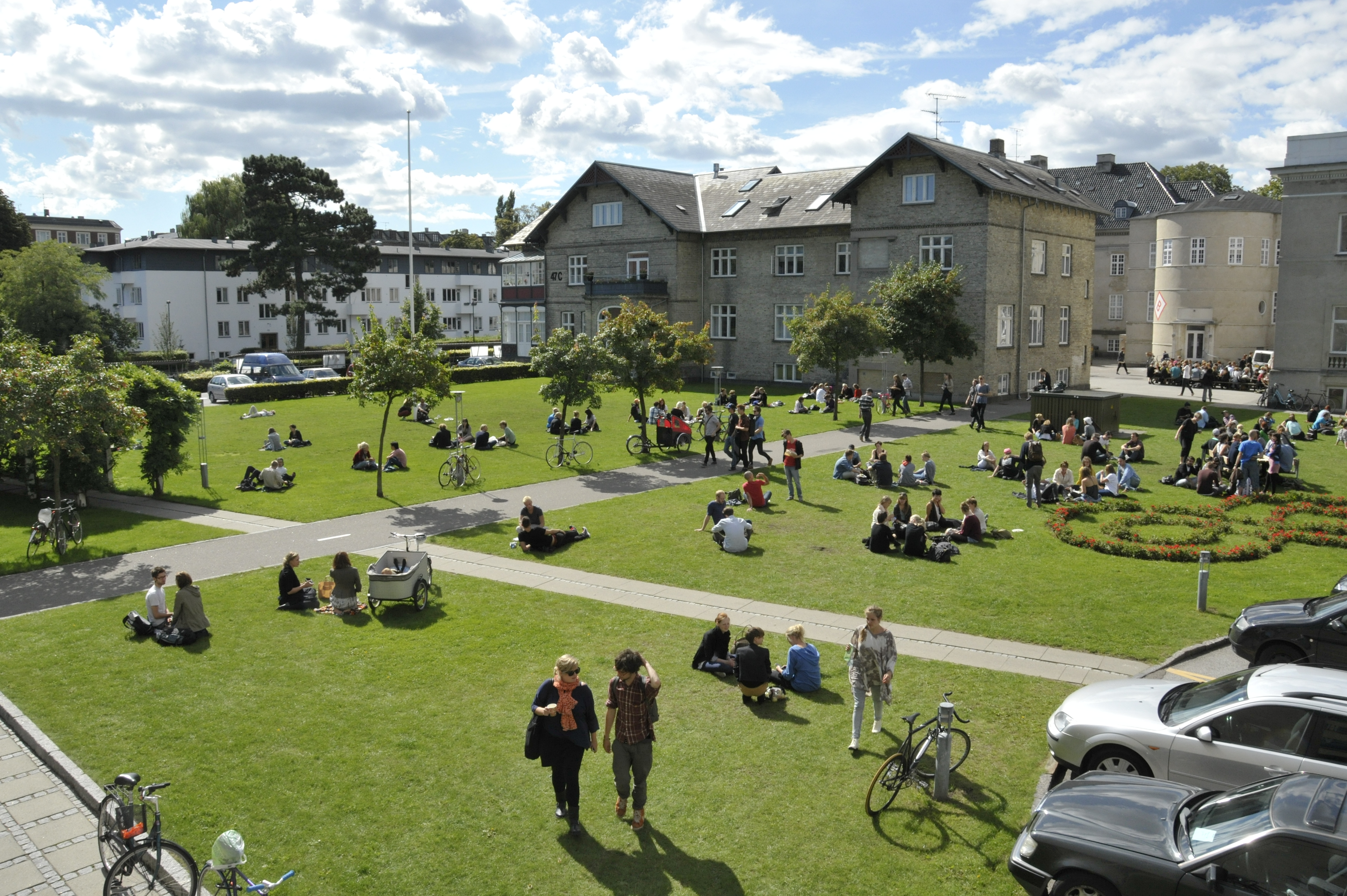
The campus area of the Danish Design School in 2010 while it was still based in the old main building of the Finsen Institute at Strandboulevarden

The Danish Design School traces its roots back to the foundation of the Arts and Crafts School (Danish: Tegne- og Kunstindustriskolen) in 1875. Upon a merger in 1930, the school changed its name to The School of Arts and Crafts (Danish: Kunsthåndværkerskolen) and after several further mergers with other schools it changed its name to The Danish Design School (Danish: Danmarks Designskole) in 1991 and moved into the former main building of the Finsen Institute at Strandboulevarden. It changed from being an independent institution to functioning under the auspices of the Ministry of Culture.

In 2007 - 2009, it hosted the Copenhagen Institute of Interaction Design, a postgraduate school and consultancy which focuses on the area of Interaction Design.

In 2011 the school was merged with the School of Architecture and the School of Conservation, both part of the Royal Danish Academy of Fine Arts, and officially changed its name to The Royal Danish Academy of Fine Arts - The School of Design, being recognized as an institution of higher education under the Ministry of Science, Innovation and Higher Education, instead of as a cultural institution filed under the Ministry of Culture. The Design School also moved to a new campus on Holmen in Copenhagen due to the merger.

== Location ==
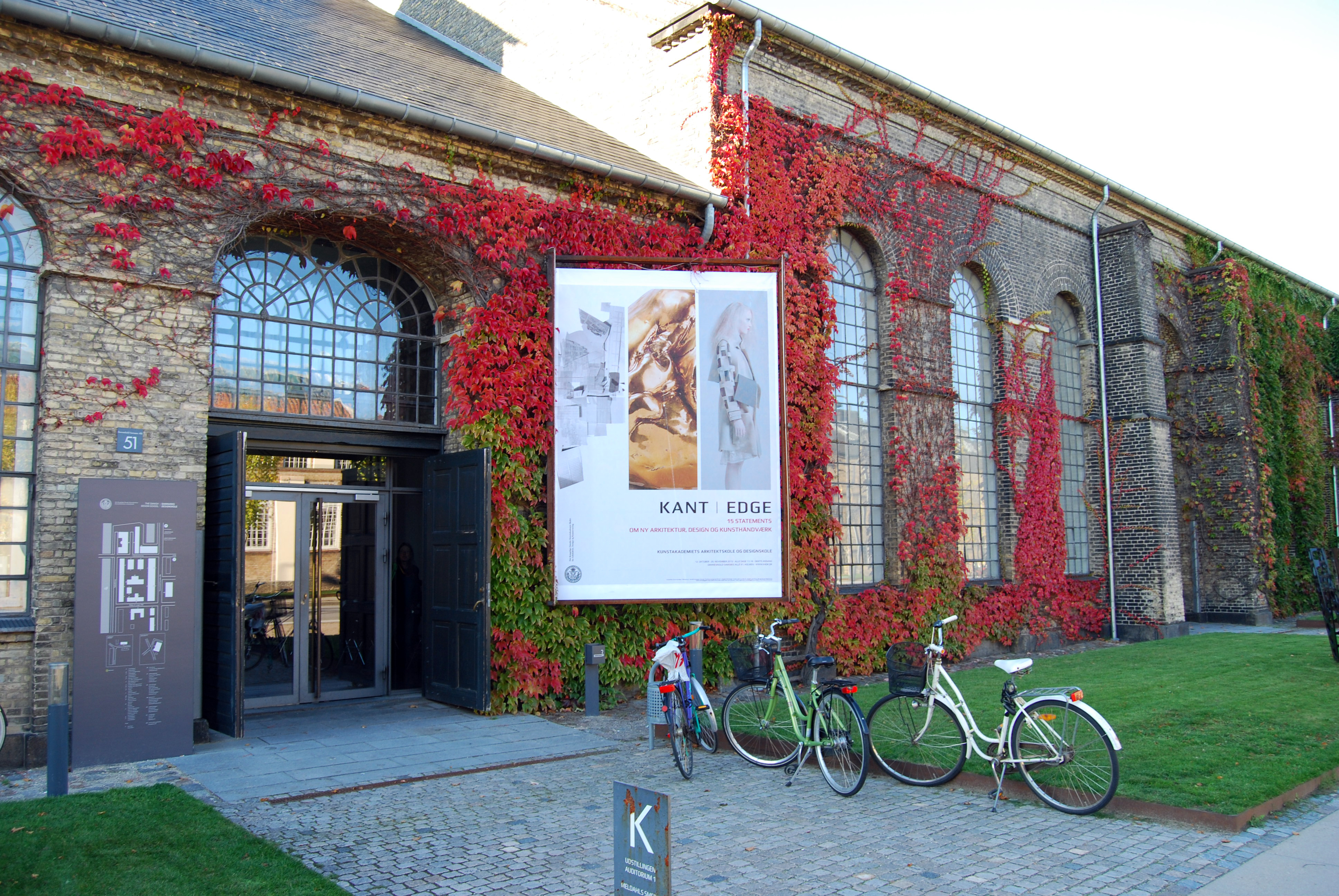
The Danish Design School in 2012, advertising an exhibition of graduation projects

In 2011 The Danish Design School moved from its old campus at the Finsens Institute in Østerbro to Philip de Langes Allé on Holmen in central Copenhagen, where it was integrated in the creative campus there, alongside educational institutions such as the Danish Film School and the School of Architecture.

== Education ==
The educational programme spans 5 years, divided into a 3-year bachelor programme and a 2-year master programme. Specializations currently on offer include fashion design, digital interaction, industrial design, ceramics and glass design, furniture and spatial design, production design, textile design, game design, and visual communication. The school carries out both basic as well as practice based and applied research, and is a member of the Danish national Center for Design Research. In 2010 the school merged with the Glass and Ceramic School on The Island of Bornholm, and is now offering a three-year programme in ceramic and glass.

== Alumni ==
- Baum und Pferdgarten
- Louise Campbell
- Hans Christensen (silversmith)
- Nanna Ditzel
- Grete Jalk
- Jacob Jensen
- Peter Jensen (fashion designer)
- Anne Kjærsgaard
- Poul Kjærholm
- Mads Kjøller Damkjær
- Cecilie Manz
- Børge Mogensen
- Kasper Salto
- Ole Wanscher
- Hans Wegner
