= Electroforming =

Electroforming process

Electroforming is a metal forming process in which parts are fabricated through electrodeposition on a model, known in the industry as a mandrel. Conductive (metallic) mandrels are treated to create a mechanical parting layer, or are chemically passivated to limit electroform adhesion to the mandrel and thereby allow its subsequent separation. Non-conductive (glass, silicon, plastic) mandrels require the deposition of a conductive layer prior to electrodeposition. Such layers can be deposited chemically, or using vacuum deposition techniques (e.g., gold sputtering). The outer surface of the mandrel forms the inner surface of the form.

The process involves passing direct current through an electrolyte containing salts of the metal being electroformed. The anode is the solid metal being electroformed, and the cathode is the mandrel, onto which the electroform gets plated (deposited). The process continues until the required electroform thickness is achieved. The mandrel is then either separated intact, melted away, or chemically dissolved.

The surface of the finished part that was in intimate contact with the mandrel is replicated in fine detail with respect to the original, and is not subject to the shrinkage that would normally be experienced in a foundry-cast metal object, or the tool marks of a milled part. The solution side of the part is less well defined, and that loss of definition increases with thickness of the deposit. In extreme cases, where a thickness of several millimetres is required, there is preferential build-up of material on sharp outside edges and corners. This tendency can be reduced by shielding, or a process known as periodic reverse, where the electroforming current is reversed for short periods and the excess is preferentially dissolved electrochemically. The finished form can either be the finished part, or can be used in a subsequent process to produce a positive of the original mandrel shape, such as with vinyl records or CD and DVD stamper manufacture.

In recent years, due to its ability to replicate a mandrel surface with practically no loss of fidelity, electroforming has taken on new importance in the fabrication of micro- and nano-scale metallic devices and in producing precision injection molds with micro- and nano-scale features for production of non-metallic micro-molded objects.

== Process ==
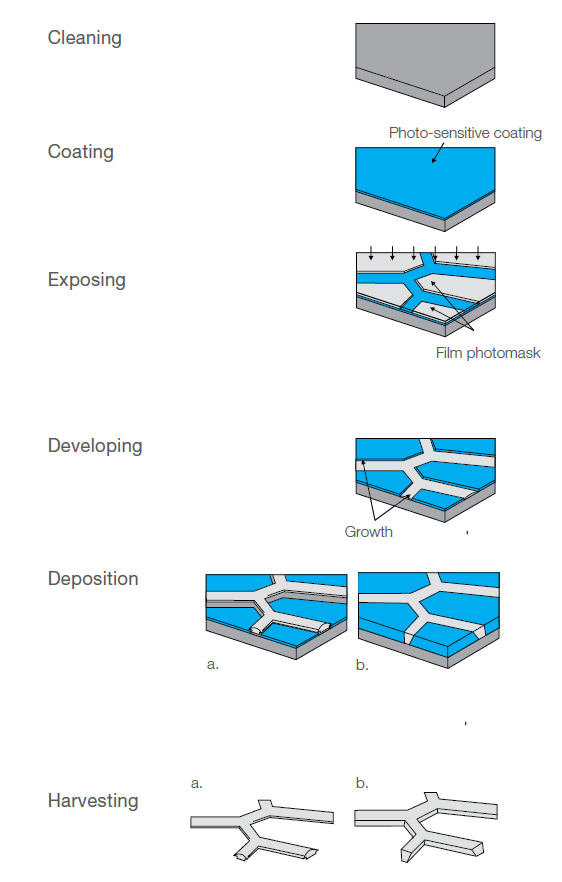
Electroforming process detail

In the basic electroforming process, an electrolytic bath is used to deposit nickel or other electroformable metal onto a conductive surface of a model (mandrel). Once the deposited material has been built up to the desired thickness, the electroform is parted from the substrate. This process allows the precise replication of the mandrel surface texture and geometry at low unit cost with high repeatability and excellent process control.

If the mandrel is made of a non-conductive material, then it can be coated with a thin conductive layer.

== Advantages and disadvantages ==
The main advantage of electroforming is that it accurately replicates the external shape of the mandrel. Generally, machining a cavity accurately is more challenging than machining a convex shape; however, the opposite holds true for electroforming because the mandrel's exterior can be accurately machined and then used to electroform a precision cavity.

Compared to other basic metal forming processes (casting, forging, stamping, deep drawing, machining, and fabricating), electroforming is very effective when requirements call for extreme tolerances, complexity, or light weight. The precision and resolution inherent in the photo-lithographically produced conductive patterned substrate allows finer geometries to be produced to tighter tolerances while maintaining superior edge definition with a near-optical finish. Electroformed metal can be extremely pure, with superior properties over wrought metal due to its refined crystal structure. Multiple layers of electroformed metals can be bonded together, or to different substrate materials, to produce complex structures with "grown-on" flanges and bosses.

Tolerances of 1.5 to 3 nanometers have been reported.

A wide variety of shapes and sizes can be made by electroforming, the principal limitation being the need to part the product from the mandrel. Since the fabrication of a product requires only a single model or mandrel, low production quantities can be made economically.

== See also ==
- LIGA
- Electrotyping
- Electroplating
- Electrochemical engineering
