= Orland Larson =

Canadian goldsmith and craft educator (1931–2026)

Orland M. F. Larson
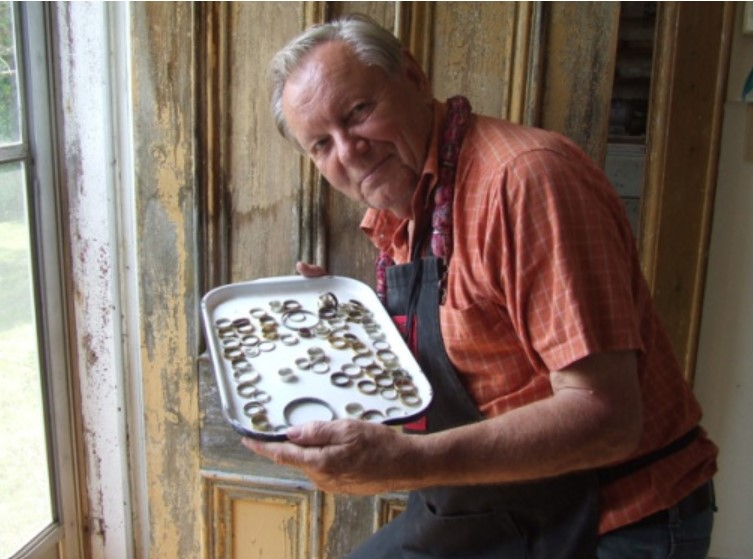
- Larson in 2020
- Born: 6 March 1931; Shaunavon, Saskatchewan, Canada
- Died: 18 February 2026 (aged 94); Saskatoon, Saskatchewan, Canada
- Occupations: Goldsmith, educator
- Known for: Goldsmithing

Orland M. F. Larson (6 March 1931 – 18 February 2026) was a Canadian goldsmith, metalsmith and art educator. He played a central role in the development of professional jewellery education in Canada, serving as head of jewellery departments at the Nova Scotia College of Art and Design and the Alberta College of Art. In addition to his teaching career, Larson held leadership positions in national and international craft organizations, including the Canadian Crafts Council and the World Crafts Council.

== Early career in Northern Canada ==
Prior to his work in post-secondary arts education, Larson worked within the federal school system in the Canadian Arctic. During the mid-1960s, he served as a school principal in Qikiqtarjuaq (then known as Broughton Island). In this capacity, he administered the local day school, which operated within the federal framework of the era that boarded children from surrounding camps in local hostels.

== Art education and academic career ==
Larson played a central role in the development of professional jewellery training in Canada during the 1960s and 1970s. He founded the jewellery program at the Nova Scotia College of Art and Design (NSCAD University) in Halifax, serving as the head of the studio until 1977.

Following his tenure in Nova Scotia, Larson moved to Calgary in the early 1980s. He became the head of the Jewellery and Metalsmithing department at the Alberta College of Art (now the Alberta University of the Arts), where he was responsible for reorganizing the department while continuing to teach.

== Craft advocacy and leadership ==
In addition to his academic work, Larson held significant administrative positions in the craft sector. During the late 1970s, he served as the president of the Canadian Crafts Council. His presidency coincided with the launch of Artisan '78, the first national travelling exhibition of contemporary Canadian craft. Larson authored the introduction to the exhibition's catalogue, which defined the project's national scope.

In conjunction with Artisan ’78, the National Gallery of Canada sponsored Larson to conduct a cross-country speaking tour regarding the standards of contemporary craft. This tour was part of the "Norah McCullough Lecture Series on Craft," established to honour McCullough's contributions to the gallery.

Larson also engaged in international advocacy, serving as the vice-president (North America) for the World Crafts Council and was a founding member and vice president of the Society of North American Goldsmiths.

== Death ==
Larson died on 18 February 2026, at the age of 94.

== Recognition ==
Larson was cited in historical surveys of the field, such as Ornament and Object: Canadian Jewellery and Metal Art, 1946–1996 and Head, Heart & Hands: Craftspeople in Nova Scotia, as a key figure in the professionalization of Canadian studio craft and the development of its educational infrastructure. His professional status was further noted in reference texts including the 16th edition of Who’s Who in American Art and as a member in good standing of the Royal Canadian Academy of Arts.

== See also ==
- Studio craft
- Nova Scotia College of Art and Design
- Alberta University of the Arts
- Canadian Crafts Federation
- World Crafts Council
