= Phillip Fike =

American jewelry artist

- Born: 1927; Baraboo, Wisconsin
- Died: December 8, 1997 (aged 69–70); Grosse Pointe, Michigan
- Known for: Metalsmith

Phillip George Fike (1927–1997) was an American metalsmith and jeweler.

== Early life and education ==
Fike was born in 1927 in Baraboo, Wisconsin. In April of 1945 Fike finished high school and directly enlisted in the U.S. Navy. He attended University of Wisconsin under the G.I. Bill. where he studied Applied Art. Fike earned his Master of Science degree in 1951 from the University of Wisconsin. Fike taught art at Wayne University in 1953 and continued teaching there for 45 years.

== Career and achievements ==
He is known for his work in the decorative metal technique of niello as well as reintroducing the fibula brooch to contemporary metalsmiths. Niello involves filling designs engraved on the surface of metal. To share this technique with others, Fike taught workshops around the U.S.

Fike was a founding member of the Society of North American Goldsmiths. Fike was the person who coined the acronym “SNAG” for this society. The goal of the SNAG organization was to create diversity and encourage creativity in the metalsmith world. In 1983 he was named a Master Metalsmith by the Metal Museum in Memphis. In 1988 he was named a fellow of the American Craft Council.

Fike characterized himself as “a simple American Metalsmith competing with the excellence of the past.” He was known for integrating mechanics into his work, as he had a passion for mechanics and metalsmithing. His more known works include interlocking wedding bands, the fibulae brooch, and moving ear ornaments.

His work is in the Detroit Institute of Arts, The Metal Museum, the National Gallery of Art, the Smithsonian American Art Museum.

== Later life ==
After becoming a proficient metalsmith, he was introduced to blacksmithing by L. Brent Kington. This inspired him to incorporate iron into his later works.

Fike suffered from pulmonary fibrosis, and towards the end of his life, he had to be on oxygen assistance nearly 24 hours a day. Despite his condition, he continued teaching and made cross-country journeys to attend the SNAG conference and the National Ornamental Metal Museum’s Annual Repair Days. Fike died in Grosse Pointe on December 8, 1997.
