= Harold Gordon Stacey =

Canadian artist and silversmith

- Born: 26 August 1911; Montreal, Canada
- Died: 28 March 1979 (aged 67); Toronto, Canada
- Occupation: Silversmith
- Children: 2
- Relatives: C.W. Jefferys (father-in-law)

Harold Gordon Stacey (26 August 1911 – 28 March 1979) was a Canadian designer and silversmith, described as having been early in his career "Canada's foremost creator of individually designed household silverware."

Stacey was born in Montreal to Frederick H. Stacey (1880 – 1940), an engineer, and Gladys Devlin (1883 – 1977), a journalist. His family moved to Toronto, and he left school in 1928. He worked for IBM servicing machines from 1929 to 1932, and during that time studied metalwork at Central Technical School.

In 1941 he married schoolteacher Margaret Ellen "Peggy" Jefferys, daughter of artist C.W. Jefferys; they had two children (son Robert, an art critic and curator, and daughter Clara).

== Career ==
In 1932 he began to do metal work full time, using silver, pewter, brass and copper. In 1936 Stacey met Douglas Duncan, who offered him studio space in the Picture Loan Society building, where David Milne had a room on the same floor.

In 1940, after World War II began, he went to a laboratory, Research Enterprises, for war work, "to make experimental models in radio and radar." He ended up in charge of the "radio engineering model shop," and this work was deemed so important his application for overseas service was denied.

In 1946 he was invited by Fred Brigden to teach at the Ontario College of Art, where he stayed for five years. He resumed teaching later in life, and from 1968 to 1975 he taught in the Creative Arts Division of Humber College.

Also in 1946, Stacey was one of the five founders of the Metal Arts Guild, along with Nancy Meek Pocock. A 1955 newspaper report on a Guild event noted that Stacey, then the president, would be doing a demonstration, and that "his fine craftsmanship in designing silverware is known in the United States as well as this country." Later, in 1969, Stacey was one of three founding Canadian members of the Society of North American Goldsmiths.

For a short period in the early 1950s Stacey was in the United States, having gone to the Rhode Island School of Design in 1949 for a workshop. A silver bowl he made there was exhibited at the Metropolitan Museum of Art in 1950. In 1950 Steuben Glass invited Stacey to head a group looking at production of silverware for Corning, but the experiment was cancelled.

Stacey was commissioned by various institutions for special silver work. In 1948 the Canadian government chose him to design and make silverware for its embassies: a newspaper report said that Stacey, "who has received Dominion-wide recognition for his fine metalwork, is charged with creating the requisite articles." (In 1950 this ended well before it was finished, with an "abrupt cancellation.") In 1955 he made a processional cross (designed by A. Scott Carter) for the chapel at Trinity College in Toronto: "the 2-part staff is of ebony, the sterling mounts and the cross itself are mounted with semi-precious gems." The University of Western Ontario had "a great salt and a grace cup" made by him for formal dinners, "fine examples of Mr. Stacey's high standard ... designed with traditional feeling, although not as copies of any period pieces."

Stacey's work Coffee Set was shown at a 1976 exhibition at the Ontario College of Art. In a review in Canada Crafts, Jeanne Parkin wrote of the four-piece set (made in 1950 for Douglas Duncan) that its "simplicity and elegance ... made this an example of truly classic beauty which has withstood the test of time, and one that demonstrates the kind of standards we are searching for in establishing a tradition of design excellence in this country."

== Legacy ==
Stacey was named an honorary member of the Canadian Crafts Council (now the Canadian Crafts Federation) "to recognize [his] significant contributions to contemporary Canadian craft."

Stacey's work is held in several collections, including the National Gallery of Canada, which has Ladle (1959) and Coffee Service (1960). In 2016 Coffee Service was shown at the Gardiner Museum in Toronto in an exhibition titled "True Nordic: How Scandinavia Influenced Design in Canada."
