= Mary Lee Hu =

American artist, goldsmith and educator

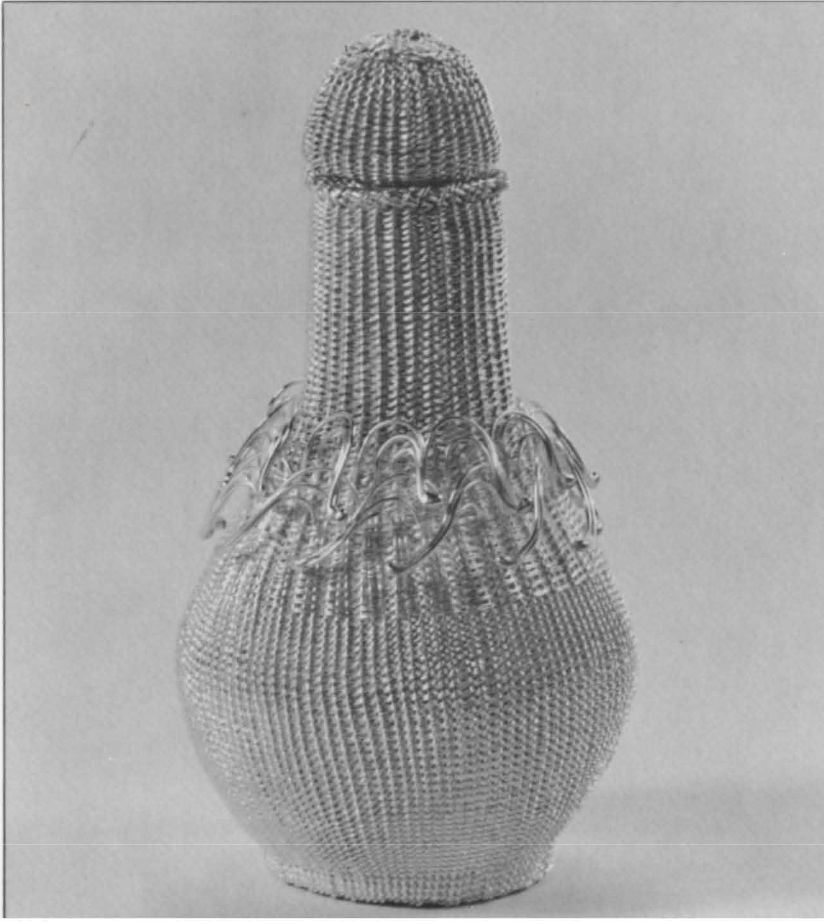
'BASKET NO. 6, 1976', American Metal Work, 1976

Mary Lee Hu (born 1943) is an American artist, goldsmith, and college educator, known for using textile techniques to create intricate woven wire jewelry.

== Early life and education ==
Mary Lee Hu was born 1943, in Lakewood, Ohio. Hu first became fascinated with metalwork during high school introductory courses. She later explored more work with metals during a summer camp.

She went on to attend Miami University in Oxford, Ohio for two years; followed by Cranbrook Academy of Art in Bloomfield Hills, Michigan, to complete her undergraduate degree (BFA 1965, metalsmithing).

During her undergraduate education Hu developed her skills and continued to work with small scale metalwork and jewelry. She received a graduate degree (MFA 1967, metalsmithing) from Southern Illinois University in Carbondale, Illinois, where she studied under metalsmith L. Brent Kington. It was during this time that Hu started to work with fiber inspired techniques after taking a fiber arts course. This led to the development of her signature style of wire wrapped jewelry.

== Career ==
Since the late 1960s Hu has developed new techniques in coiling, wrapping, weaving, knitting, and twining wire. Her work consists mostly woven wire earrings, rings, bracelets, brooches, and neckpieces that emulate natural forms, movements and symmetry.

After completing her master of fine arts degree, Hu traveled to various places and took up different teaching positions until she joined the metal arts program in the University of Washington in the School of Art in 1980. She retired from the University of Washington as professor emeritus in 2006.

Hu is a member and past president of the Society of North American Goldsmiths. In 1996 Hu was inducted into the American Craft Council College of Fellows. Hu has received three National Endowment of the Arts Craftsman Fellowships. Her work is in major collections such as the Victoria and Albert Museum, the Renwick Gallery, the American Crafts Museum and the Art Institute of Chicago. Hu is the winner of the 2008 Irving and Yvonne Twining Humber Award for Lifetime Artistic Achievement.

== Teaching ==
- 1968-1969: Southern Illinois University
- 1976: University of Iowa
- 1976:Kansas State University
- 1976–1977: University of Wisconsin–Madison
- 1977–1980: Michigan State University
- 1980–2006: University of Washington

== Awards and grants ==
- 1975: Best in Show, Best in Metals, Outstanding Craftsman of the North Central Region, Purchase Award, \"Beaux Arts Designer/Craftsman '75\", Columbus Museum of Fine Arts, Columbus, OH
- 1976: National Endowment for the Arts Crafts Fellowship
- 1978: All-University Research Grant, Michigan State University
- 1979: All-University Research Grant, Michigan State University
- 1984: National Endowment for the Arts Crafts Fellowship
- 1988: Alumni Achievement Award, Southern Illinois University-Carbondale
- 1992: National Endowment for the Arts Crafts Fellowship
- 1996: Appointed as a Fellow of the American Crafts Council
- 1999: Elected "Master of the Medium" for the James C. Renwick Alliance, the Renwick Gallery, Smithsonian, Washington, DC
- 2001–2002: Flintridge Foundation Award for Visual Artists
- 2002 Donald E. Peterson Endowed Fellowship for Excellence, College of Arts and Sciences, University of Washington
- 2004: Invited to start a Mary Lee Hu research collection at The Archives of American Art, Smithsonian Institution, Washington, DC, part of the Nanette L. Laitman Documentation Project for Craft and Decorative Arts in America.
- 2008: The Irving and Yvonne Twining Humber Award for Lifetime Artistic Achievement from Artist Trust of Washington.

== Public collections ==
- Arkansas Arts Center, Little Rock, Arkansas
- The Metropolitan Museum of Art, New York City, New York
- Columbus Museum of Art, Columbus, Ohio
- Illinois State University, Normal, Illinois
- Museum of Arts and Design (formerly American Crafts Museum), New York City, New York
- Renwick Gallery, National Museum of American Art, Washington D.C.
- Art Institute of Chicago, Chicago, Illinois
- Museum of Fine Arts, Boston, Boston, Massachusetts
- Museum of Fine Arts, Houston, Houston, Texas
- Smithsonian American Art Museum, Washington, D.C.
- Tacoma Art Museum, Tacoma, Washington
- Victoria and Albert Museum, London, England
- University of Indiana Art Gallery, Bloomington, Indiana
- Yale University Art Gallery, New Haven, Connecticut

== Exhibitions ==
1967

- Crafts Alliance Gallery, St. Louis, MO

1969

- "Young Americans '69", Museum of Contemporary Crafts, New York, NY

1970–72

- "Goldsmith ‘70", Minnesota Museum of Art, St. Paul, MN

1974

- University of Iowa, Iowa City, IA
- "World Silver Fair", International competition, Taxco and Mexico City, Mexico
- "Profile 1974", Humber College, Rexdale, Etobicoke, Ontario, Canada

1974–77

- "Goldsmith/74", by the Renwick Gallery and the Minnesota Museum of Art.

1975

- "Contemporary Crafts of the Americas: 1975", Competitive exhibition, Colorado State University national tour
- "Beaux Arts designer/Craftsmen ‘75", Columbus Gallery of Fine Arts, Columbus, OH.

1975–76

- "Forms in Metal-275 Years of Metalsmithing in America", Museum of Contemporary Crafts, New York, NY

1976

- University of Wisconsin–Madison, Madison, WI
- "6 Contemporary American Jewellers", Electrum Gallery, London

1977

- Columbus Museum of Art, Columbus, OH
- Illinois State University, Normal, IL
- "Creative Jewelry", Design Center, Manila, Philippines

1978

- "Modern American Jewelry Exhibition", Mikimoto & Co., Tokyo
- "American Crafts at the Vatican Museum", Vatican City
- Goldsmith Hall, London (with Harper, Scherr, Seppa)

1978–82

- "Silver in American Life", Yale University Art Gallery

1979

- Eastern Kentucky University Gallery, Richmond, KY
- "Fourth International Jewellery Art Exhibition", Jewellery Designers Association, Mikimoto, Tokyo

1979–81

1980

- Pittsburgh Center for the Arts, Pittsburgh, PA
- "International Jewellery 1900-1980", Kunslerhaus, Vienna

1981

- University of North Dakota, Grand Forks, ND
- "Tenth anniversary Exhibition", Electrum Gallery, London, England
- "The Golden Thread-Textures in Gold", Touring International Competition

1981–85

- "Good as Gold: Alternative Materials in American Jewelry", Renwick Gallery, Smithsonian, Washington, DC, national tour

1982

- Middle Tennessee State University, Murfreesboro, TN

1983

- University of Louisiana, Lafayette, LA
- Invitational of American Jewelry, Kyoto Municipal Museum of Traditional Industry, Kyoto

1984

- The Hand and the Spirit Gallery, Scottsdale, AZ

1984–85

- "Jewelry USA", organized by the Museum of Art and Design, New York, NY, national tour

1985

- "Barbara Rockefeller Associates Collection", Anatole Orient Gallery, London, England
- "Masterworks of Contemporary American Jewelry: Sources and Concepts", The Victoria and Albert Museum, London, England
- "International Jewelry Invitational", Rudolf Dentler Gallery, Ulm, Germany

1985–87

- "American Jewelry NOW", Museum of Art and Design, New York, NY, Asia tour

1986–88

- "Craft Today, Poetry of the Physical", Museum of Art and Design, New York, NY, national tour

1987–90

- "The Eloquent Object", organized by The Philbrook Museum of Art, Tulsa, OK, US and Japan tour

1988

- Concepts Gallery, Carmel and Palo Alto, CA
- "Korean-American Contemporary Metalwork Exhibition 1988", Walker Hill Art Center, Seoul, Korea

1989

- "Mary Lee Hu: Goldsmith", The Merrin Gallery, New York, NY

1989–93

- "Craft Today USA", Museum of Arts and Design, New York, NY and European Tour

1991

- "The 20th Anniversary Show", Electrum Gallery, London, England

1992

- "Design Visions, The Second Australian International Crafts Triennial". Art Gallery of Western Australia
- "Helen Williams Drutt Collection", Helsinki, Finland

1993

- "Documents Northwest: 6 Northwest Jewelers" Seattle Art Museum, Seattle, WA

1993–96

- "Sculptural Concerns: Contemporary American Metalworking",Fort Wayne Museum of Art, national tour

1994

- "Mary Lee Hu: Master Metalsmith", National Ornamental Metal Museum, Memphis, TN

1997

- "Celebrating American Craft", Kunstindustrie Museum, Copenhagen, Denmark

2000

- "Curves Revisited", Susan Cummins Gallery, Mill Valley, CA

2001

- "Flet/Braid", Nordjyllands Kunstmuseum, Aalborg, Denmark

2002

- Summer Arts Festival Mirabela Arts Exhibit, Odegaard Undergraduate Library, University of Washington
- "Exuberance", Facere Jewelry Art Gallery, Seattle (with Kevin Glenn Crane)

2003

- "The Art of Gold" organized by the Society of North American Goldsmiths and tours by Exhibits USA Crocker Art Museum

2004

- "The Art of Gold"
- The Arkansas Art Center, Little Rock, AR
- The Mint Museum of Art, Charlotte, NC
- Anchorage Museum of History and Art, Anchorage, AK
- "Korean & American Metalsmithing Exhibition", Kepco Plaza Gallery, Seoul, Korea.
