= Gary Noffke =

American artist and metalsmith (born 1943)

Gary Lee Noffke
- Born: August 27, 1943 (age 83); Decatur, Illinois, US
- Education: Eastern Illinois University
- Known for: metalsmithing
- Movement: studio craft movement in jewelry and hollowware

Gary Lee Noffke (born August 27, 1943) is an American artist and metalsmith. Known for versatility and originality, he is a blacksmith, coppersmith, silversmith, goldsmith, and toolmaker. He has produced gold and silver hollowware, cutlery, jewelry, and forged steelware. Noffke is noted for his technical versatility, his pioneering research into hot forging, the introduction of new alloys, and his ability to both build on and challenge traditional techniques. He has been called the metalsmith's metalsmith, a pacesetter, and a maverick. He is also an educator who has mentored an entire generation of metalsmiths. He has received numerous awards and honors. He has exhibited internationally, and his work is represented in collections around the world.

Noffke along with Barbara Mann designed the original artwork for the Delta Prize for Global Understanding.

Noffke taught for many years at the University of Georgia. Today he is retired from formal teaching and lives and works at his studio in Farmington, Georgia.

== Early life ==
Gary Lee Noffke was born in Decatur, Illinois and grew up in the small town of Sullivan, Illinois. His father worked in a shoe factory. His German grandfather had a small farm and was still using a mule to plow his fields. His family being poor, Noffke made his own toys out of whatever materials were at hand, scavenged from the farm, the factory, and construction sites. With just a hand saw and a pocket knife, he created birdhouses, slingshots, hinged boxes, and bows and arrows. To this day he makes his own tools. At the age of 12, encouraged by his mother and a neighbor who was a landscape painter, he began drawing and painting in oils. His mother was later able to help pay for his education by working at, and then becoming the owner of, a shelter care home business.

== Education ==
Noffke enrolled at Eastern Illinois University, getting his BS in 1965 and his MS in Education 1966. In 1967 he went to the University of Iowa intending to study painting, but soon found himself attracted to metalsmithing. He had already been exposed to metal in a course he took from Garret de Ruiter while at Eastern Illinois University. For a while at Iowa he studied metalwork under Raoul Delmar but soon abandoned that school and moved on to Southern Illinois University at Carbondale where he studied with Brent Kington who was leading a revival of blacksmithing which lasted well into the 1970s. At Carbondale he met other up and coming metal artists such as Mary Lee Hu. He learned to forge steel and was particularly impressed by a simple knife made by his mentor, Kington. Noffke got his Master of Fine Arts at SIU in 1969.

== Career ==
While he still was studying painting, Noffke had been influenced by the abstract expressionism of Willem de Kooning and Jackson Pollock. Just as these painters had attacked the canvas with swirls, drips, splashes, and smears, Noffke would attack the surface of his metal objects with obsessive and intricate detail consisting of stars, letterforms, arrows, crosses, dollar signs, eyes, and other obscure symbols. These richly detailed surfaces, stamped, engraved, and carved into the metal illustrate a paradox evident in all of the artist's work. On one hand, each object presents a surface of inscrutable markings. On the other hand, each object is in the end just an ordinary bowl, spoon, knife, or some other purely utilitarian object.

Noffke first taught at Stetson University in DeLand, Florida, and then at California State College at Los Angeles. In 1971, he took a position at the University of Georgia at Athens where he was to remain for the next thirty years.

Noffke was awarded a faculty research grant in the early 1970s from the University of Georgia to explore the cold forging of fine silver from sheet. Expert opinion said that the hot forging of fine silver was impossible; but Noffke discovered an alloy that made it easy. He discovered that by eliminating some of the copper content in sterling silver he was able to cast his own billets of 969 silver. Still later he developed a method to forge gold from cast billets.

In the years 1977 to 1979 Noffke, working with the University of Georgia and several other artists, put together three annual "National Ring Shows" featuring the younger generation of metalsmiths. The shows did not rely on museums but were escorted around the country by the participants themselves. The idea was so successful, that The Lamar Dodd School of Art and the Georgia Museum of Art repeated the format again in 2011.

For thirty years Noffke taught at the University of Georgia and then retired from active teaching. He built his own studio—and all the tools in that studio—in the hills near Farmington, Georgia. Some of those tools along with his refrigerator from the studio were featured in his solo exhibition at Charlotte's Mint Museum in the fall of 2011. Richly and elaborately decorated, it is a perfect example of the artist's usual blending of surrealistic decoration and practical utility.

== Award and honors ==
- 2005: Selected as one of the Fifty Outstanding Alumni of Fifty Years of Graduate Education by Eastern Illinois University
- 2001: Elected to College of Fellows by the American Craft Council
- 1990: NEA Visual Artist Fellowship in Craft
- 1988: Master Metalsmith of the Year award by the National Ornamental Metal Museum

== Exhibitions ==
From April to September 2011 the Mint Museum in Charlotte, North Carolina presented a major retrospective of the artist's work titled, Attitude and Alchemy: The Metalwork of Gary Lee Noffke. This was the first museum-organized project about Noffke in 20 years and featured over 120 pieces of his work, including silver and gold hollowware, flatware, jewelry, and objects forged in steel.

A comprehensive list of exhibitions which have featured Noffke's work is shown below.

=== Solo ===
- 2011 Attitude and Alchemy: The Metalwork of Gary Lee Noffke, Mint Museum of Craft + Design, Charlotte, North Carolina
- 1991 Chasing the Runcible Spoon, John Michael Kohler Arts Center, Sheboygan, Wisconsin.
- 1988 National Ornamental Metal Museum, Memphis, Tennessee
- 1981 Western Carolina University, Cullowhee, North Carolina
- 1979 National Ornamental Metal Museum, Memphis, Tennessee
- 1971 Humboldt State University, Arcata, California
- 1970 University of Georgia, Visual Arts Gallery, Athens, Georgia
- 1970 San Diego State University, San Diego, California

=== Group ===
- 2009 Soul’s Journey: Inside the Creative Process, The Center for Craft, Creativity & Design, Henderson, North Carolina
- 2008—2010 Tradition/Innovation, American Masterpieces of Southern Craft and Traditional Art, The Southern Arts Federation (NEA sponsored show traveled nationally)
- 2008—2009 Ring Shows: Then & Now and Putting the Band Back Together, Georgia Museum of Art (University of Georgia sponsored show traveled nationally)
- 2008 Is That Supposed to Be Funny? Wit, Sarcasm, and Humor in Craft, Penland Gallery, Spruce Pine, North Carolina
- 2007 Southeastern Invitational Craft Exhibition, The Bascom: A Center for the Visual Arts, Highlands, North Carolina
- 2006—2007 Material and Space, Missouri State University Art and Design Gallery, Springfield, Missouri (exhibition traveled nationally)
- 2005 Contemporary Cast Iron, National Ornamental Metal Museum, Memphis
- 2004 The Nature of Craft and the Penland Experience, Mint Museum of Craft + Design, Charlotte, North Carolina
- 2003—2006 The Art of Gold organized by the Society of North American Goldsmiths and Exhibits USA (a national touring exhibitions program)
- 2002 Contemporary Metalwork and Jewelry from Six Countries, Gallery Mukkumto, Seoul, Korea
- 2001 Objects for Use: Handmade by Design, The American Craft Museum, New York, New York
- 2001 Fellow's Exhibition, Work from the 2001 Awardees, The American Craft Council College of Fellows, S.O.F.A., Chicago, Illinois
- 2000 Rare to Well Done: Culinary Craft, National Ornamental Metal Museum, Memphis, Tennessee
- 1999—2000 Pieces that Serve, Yaw Gallery, S.O.F.A., New York, New York
- 1999 Seoul International Metal Artists Invitational Exhibition, Seoul Arts Center, Seoul, Korea
- 1999 Handmade: Shifting Paradigms, Singapore Art Museum, Singapore
- 1999 The End is Near—Artists Look at the 20th Century, Charles A. Wustum Museum of Fine Arts, Racine Wisconsin
- 1998 V + V (Five Plus Five), Craft Alliance Gallery, St. Louis, Missouri
- 1998 The Functional Vase Project, Yaw Gallery, S.O.F.A., Birmingham, Missouri
- 1998 Raised Metal Sculpture Exhibition, William Traver Gallery, Seattle, Washington
- 1998 Raised from Tradition: Hollowware Past and Present, The Seafirst Gallery at Columbia Seafirst Center, Seattle, Washington
- 1998 Refined North American Metalsmithing Exhibition, Stephen F. Austin Gallery, Nacogdoches, Texas
- 1997—1998 Watching and Waiting: Timepieces by Jewelers, Mobilia Gallery, Cambridge, Massachusetts
- 1997—1998 L'Chaim, International Invitational Exhibition of Multi-Media Kiddush Cups, Contemporary Jewish Museum, San Francisco, California
- 1997—1998 American Masters of Hollowware in the Late 20th Century, Georgia Museum of Art, Athens, Georgia/National Ornamental Metal Museum, Memphis, Tennessee
- 1997 The Teapot Redefined, S.O.F.A., Chicago, Illinois/Mobilia Gallery, Cambridge, Massachusetts
- 1997 Spotlight 97, American Craft Council Southeast Region Juried Crafts Exhibition, Hickory Museum of Art, Hickory, North Carolina
- 1997 Food Glorious Food, Charles A. Wustum Museum of Fine Arts, Racine Wisconsin
- 1997 Centennial Metals Exhibition, Society of Arts and Crafts, Boston, Massachusetts
- 1996 Pig Iron Art Cookers, National Ornamental Metal Museum, Memphis, Tennessee
- 1996 Ornament, National Invitational Jewelry Exhibition, Penland Gallery, Spruce Pine, North Carolina
- 1995—1997 The Commemorative Cup, Rosanne Raab Associates, New York, New York (exhibition traveled nationally)
- 1995—1997 Double Vision, Gallery IO, New Orleans, Louisiana, sponsored by Charles A. Wustum Museum of Fine Arts, Racine Wisconsin (exhibition traveled nationally)
- 1993 Implements, Kohler Design Center, Kohler, Wisconsin
- 1992—1994 Borne with a Silver Spoon, Rosanne Raab Associates, New York, New York (exhibition traveled nationally)
- 1991 Other Voices, Nancy Margolis Gallery, New York, New York
- 1990—1991 Vessels from Use to Symbol, The American Craft Museum, New York, New York
- 1989—1990 Silver: New Forms and Expressions, Fortunoff, New York, New York (exhibition traveled nationally)
- 1989 Dashboard Art, John Michael Kohler Arts Center, Sheboygan, Wisconsin
- 1989 City on a Hill, Twenty Years of Art at Cortona, Georgia Museum of Art, Athens, Georgia/Venice, Italy
- 1988—1990 Metals Invitational, Visual Arts Resources, University of Oregon, Eugene, Oregon
- 1988 Masters in American Metalsmithing, Organized by National Ornamental Metal Museum, Memphis, Tennessee
- 1987 Southern Silver, National Ornamental Metal Museum, Memphis, Tennessee
- 1987—1990 Metals Invitational, University of Oregon, Portsmouth, Oregon
- 1987—1990 Contemporary Iron, Louisville Art Gallery, Louisville, Kentucky
- 1986 Workshop Leaders Exhibition, The American Craft Council, Southeast Region Conference, Thomas Center Gallery, Gainesville, Florida
- 1986 A Decade of American Blacksmithing, National Ornamental Metal Museum, Memphis, Tennessee
- 1985 Presenters Exhibition, The 6th Yuma Symposium, Arizona Western College, Yuma, Arizona
- 1984 The Great West Jewelry/Metal Symposium and Exhibition, Northern Arizona University, Flagstaff, Arizona
- 1984 Modern Metal Show, Central Washington University, Ellensburg, Washington
- 1984 Implements, Ten Arrow Gallery, Cambridge, Massachusetts
- 1984 Contemporary Iron, Louisville Art Gallery, Louisville, Kentucky
- 1984 A Mano National Metal Invitational, New Mexico State University, Las Cruces, New Mexico
- 1984 Tiki Exhibition, Penland School of Crafts, Spruce Pine, North Carolina
- 1983 Metal and Enamel Invitational, Robert Else Gallery, California State University, Sacramento, California
- 1983 Remains to be Seen, John Michael Kohler Arts Center, Sheboygan, Wisconsin
- 1983 Crafts, An Expanding Definition, John Michael Kohler Arts Center, Sheboygan, Wisconsin
- 1982—1983 20 Years of Metal, Southern Illinois University, Carbondale, Illinois (exhibition traveled nationally)
- 1981 The Cutting Edge, Louisville Art Commission, Frankfort, Kentucky
- 1981—2000 Mostra, Palazzo Vagnotti, Cortona, Italy (1981, 1986, 1988, 1990, 1995, 2000)
- 1980—1982 Southeastern Metalsmith Traveling Exhibition, Organized by the Mint Museum Mint Museum of Art, Charlotte, North Carolina
- 1980 Metal Design Invitational, Greenville County Museum of Art, Greenville, South Carolina
- 1980 Jewelry and Metalsmithing Exhibition, Kipp Gallery, Indiana University of Pennsylvania, Indiana, Pennsylvania
- 1980 Everyday Metal, National Ornamental Metal Museum, Memphis, Tennessee/University of North Carolina, Charlotte, North Carolina
- 1980 Currents 80 - Middle Tennessee State University, Murfreesboro, Tennessee
- 1980 Art Exhibition for the Blind, Louisiana School for the Visually Impaired, Baton Rouge, Louisiana
- 1979 House Jewelry, National Ornamental Metal Museum, Memphis, Tennessee
- 1978 Symbolism in Jewelry, Gallery of Contemporary Metalsmithing, Rochester, New York
- 1978 1st National Spoon and Ashtray Exhibition, Sangre de Cristo Arts Center, Pueblo, Colorado
- 1978 2nd National Ring Show, University of Georgia, Visual Arts Gallery, Athens, Georgia
- 1977 Holiday Tree, Museum of Contemporary Crafts, New York, New York/Mondale Residence, Washington, D.C.
- 1977 Drinking Companions, John Michael Kohler Arts Center, Sheboygan, Wisconsin
- 1977 Currents 77, 5th Biennial Mid-South National Crafts Invitational, Middle Tennessee State University, Murfreesboro, Tennessee
- 1977 Contemporary Metal Crafts, Louis I. Clifford Gallery Arts and Crafts Center of Pittsburgh, Pittsburgh, Pennsylvania
- 1977 Contemporary Knives and Edged Tools, Chambers Gallery, Pennsylvania State University, University Park, Pennsylvania
- 1977 Poetry Bowls with Fritz Dreisbach, University of Georgia, Visual Arts Gallery, Athens, Georgia
- 1976 Metal Invitational, Montana State University – Bozeman, Montana
- 1976 Metal Invitational, Bradley University, Peoria, Illinois
- 1976 3rd Annual Exhibition of Contemporary Jewelry, Georgia State University, Atlanta, Georgia
- 1976—1977 Solid Wrought Iron, Southern Illinois University Museum, Carbondale, Illinois (exhibition traveled nationally)
- 1975 Precious Metals: The American Tradition in Gold and Silver, Lowe Art Museum, University of Miami, Miami, Florida
- 1975 Miniature and Delicate Object Exhibition, Galeria del Sol, Santa Barbara, California
- 1975 Metal Invitational, 1975 AD, College Art Gallery, New Paltz, New York
- 1975 Ironworks, National Invitational, Craft Center, Worcester, Massachusetts
- 1975 Headdress: An Historical and Contemporary Survey, John Michael Kohler Arts Center, Sheboygan, Wisconsin
- 1975 Fourth Invitational Contemporary Crafts Exhibition, Hawthorn Gallery, Skidmore College, Saratoga Springs, New York
- 1975—1977 The Goldsmiths/75, Minnesota Museum of Art, Saint Paul, Minnesota
- 1975—1976 100 Artists Commemorate 200 Years, Fairtree Fine Crafts Institute, New York, New York/Xerox Gallery, Rochester, New York
- 1975 Forms in Metal: 275 years of Metalsmithing in America, 1700-1940, Finch College Museum of Art/Museum of Contemporary Crafts, New York, New York
- 1974 Georgia State National Metal Invitational, Georgia State University, Atlanta, Georgia
- 1974 The Uncommon Smith, John Michael Kohler Arts Center, Sheboygan, Wisconsin
- 1974 The First World Crafts Exhibition, International Committee of Selection, Ontario Science Centre, Toronto, Ontario, Canada
- 1974 Inter D III, International Crafts Exposition, Fine Arts Gallery, Pan American University, Edinburg, Texas
- 1974 Southeastern Crafts Invitational Exhibition, Greenville County Museum of Art, Greenville, South Carolina
- 1974 American Metalsmiths Exhibition, De Cordova Museum, Lincoln, Massachusetts
- 1974 North American Goldsmith, Renwick Gallery, Smithsonian Institution, Washington, D.C./Minnesota Museum of Art, Saint Paul, Minnesota
- 1973 Profiles in Jewelry, National Jewelry Competition, Texas Tech University, Lubbock, Texas
- 1973 Objects for Preparing Food, Museum of Contemporary Crafts, New York, New York/Renwick Gallery, Smithsonian Institution, Washington, D.C.
- 1973 Smithing '73, National Blacksmithing Invitational, State University of New York at Brockport, Brockport, New York
- 1973 Objects U.S.A., National Crafts Invitational, Kent State University, Kent
- 1973 National Invitational Craft Exhibition, University of Wisconsin, School of Fine Arts, Milwaukee
- 1973 National Crafts Invitational, University of New Mexico Art Museum, Gallup
- 1972 The Contemporary American Silversmith and Goldsmith, Fairtree Fine Crafts Institute, New York, New York/Corcoran Gallery of Art, Washington, D.C.
- 1972 National Jewelry and Hollowware Exhibition, Northern Illinois University, DeKalb, Illinois
- 1972 Metal '72 Invitational, State University of New York at Brockport, Brockport, New York
- 1972 2nd Biennial Lake Superior National Crafts Exhibition, University of Minnesota Duluth Tweed Museum, Duluth, Minnesota
- 1971 Inter D-2, Crafts Open Exhibition, International Museum of Art & Science, McAllen, Texas
- 1971 8th Annual Piedmont Crafts Exhibition, Mint Museum of Art, Charlotte, North Carolina
- 1970 Atlantic Seaboard States Craftsmen Exhibition, Jacksonville Art Museum, Jacksonville, Florida
- 1970 Icasals National Jewelry Exhibition, Texas Tech University, Lubbock, Texas
- 1970 20th Florida Craftsman Exhibit, Sarasota Art Association, Sarasota, Florida
- 1970 7th Piedmont Crafts Exhibition, Mint Museum of Art, Charlotte, North Carolina
- 1968 Ball State National Drawing and Small Sculpture Show, Ball State University, Muncie

== Professional organizations ==
- National Ornamental Metal Museum
- American Craft Council
- Artist Blacksmiths Association of North America
- North Carolina Association of Craft Artists

== Books ==
- Virginia Shields, William U. Eiland, Gary Noffke, Georgia Museum of Art, Ann Orr: silversmith, goldsmith, & enamelist, Athens, Georgia, Georgia Museum of Art, University of Georgia, 1994, ISBN 0-915977-15-X
- Deborah Landon; Gary Noffke, American masters of hollowware in the late 20th century, Athens, Ga. : Georgia Museum of Art, 1997, OCLC Number: 39535972
