= Noffke =

Noffke is a German surname. Notable people with the surname include:

- Ashley Noffke (born 1977), Australian cricketer
- Chris Noffke (born 1988), Australian long jumper
- Gary Lee Noffke (born 1943), American artist and metalsmith
- W.E. Noffke (1878–1964), Canadian architect
