= List of awards and honors received by Jimmy Carter =

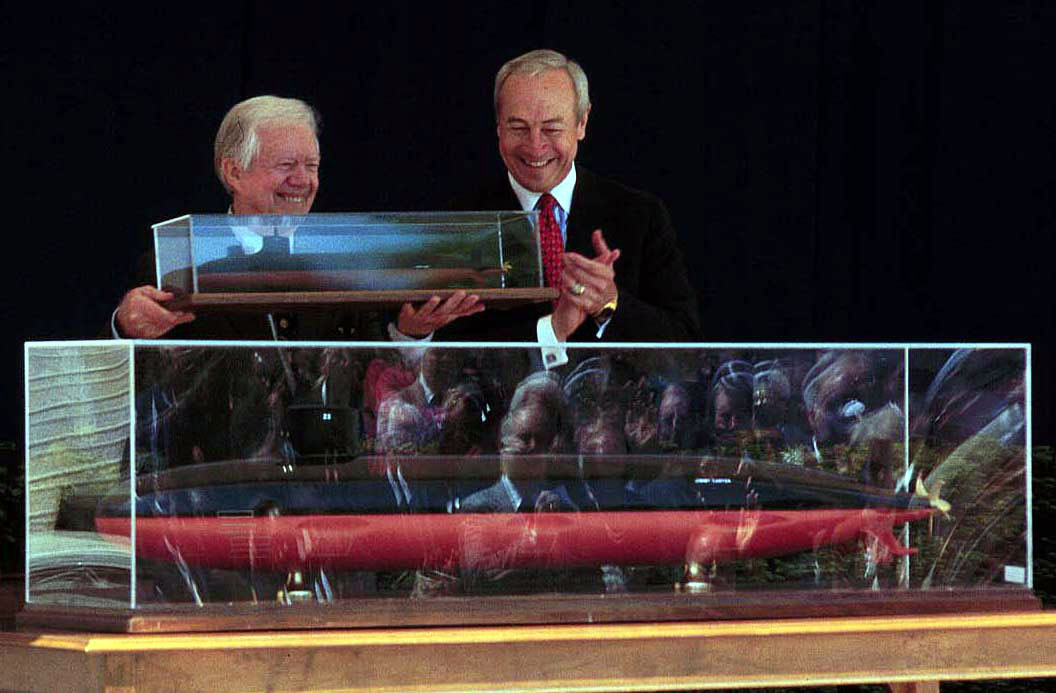
Former President and Navy submariner Jimmy Carter (left) hoists a replica of the USS Jimmy Carter (SSN-23) given to him by Secretary of the Navy John H. Dalton (right) at a naming ceremony in the Pentagon on April 28, 1998.

U.S. President Jimmy Carter (October 1, 1924 – December 29, 2024) received numerous accolades, awards, and honorary degrees. Several places, institutions, and other things have been named for him.

== Honorary doctorates ==
- Doctor of Laws : Morehouse College, 1972; Morris Brown College, 1972; University of Notre Dame, 1977; Emory University, 1979; Kwansei Gakuin University, 1981; Georgia Southwestern College, 1981; New York Law School, 1985; Bates College, 1985; Centre College, 1987; Creighton University, 1987; University of Pennsylvania, 1998; Queen's University, 2012
- Doctor of Engineering : Georgia Institute of Technology, 1979
- Doctor of Philosophy : Weizmann Institute of Science, 1980; Tel Aviv University, 1983; University of Haifa, 1987
- Doctor of Humane Letters : Central Connecticut State University, 1985; Trinity College, 1998; Hoseo University, 1998; Illinois College, 2014 George Mason University, 2024
- Doctor : G.O.C. University, Haiti, 1995; University of Juba, 2002
- Doctor of Civil Law : University of Oxford, on 20 June 2007
- Doctor of Humanities : Hong Kong Baptist University, 2011; Liberty University, on 19 May 2018

== Honorary Fellow ==
- Honorary Fellow of Royal College of Surgeons in Ireland, 2007
- Honorary Fellow of Mansfield College, Oxford, 2007
- He was made an honorary member of The Phi Beta Kappa Society at Kansas State University in 1991.

== Accolades ==
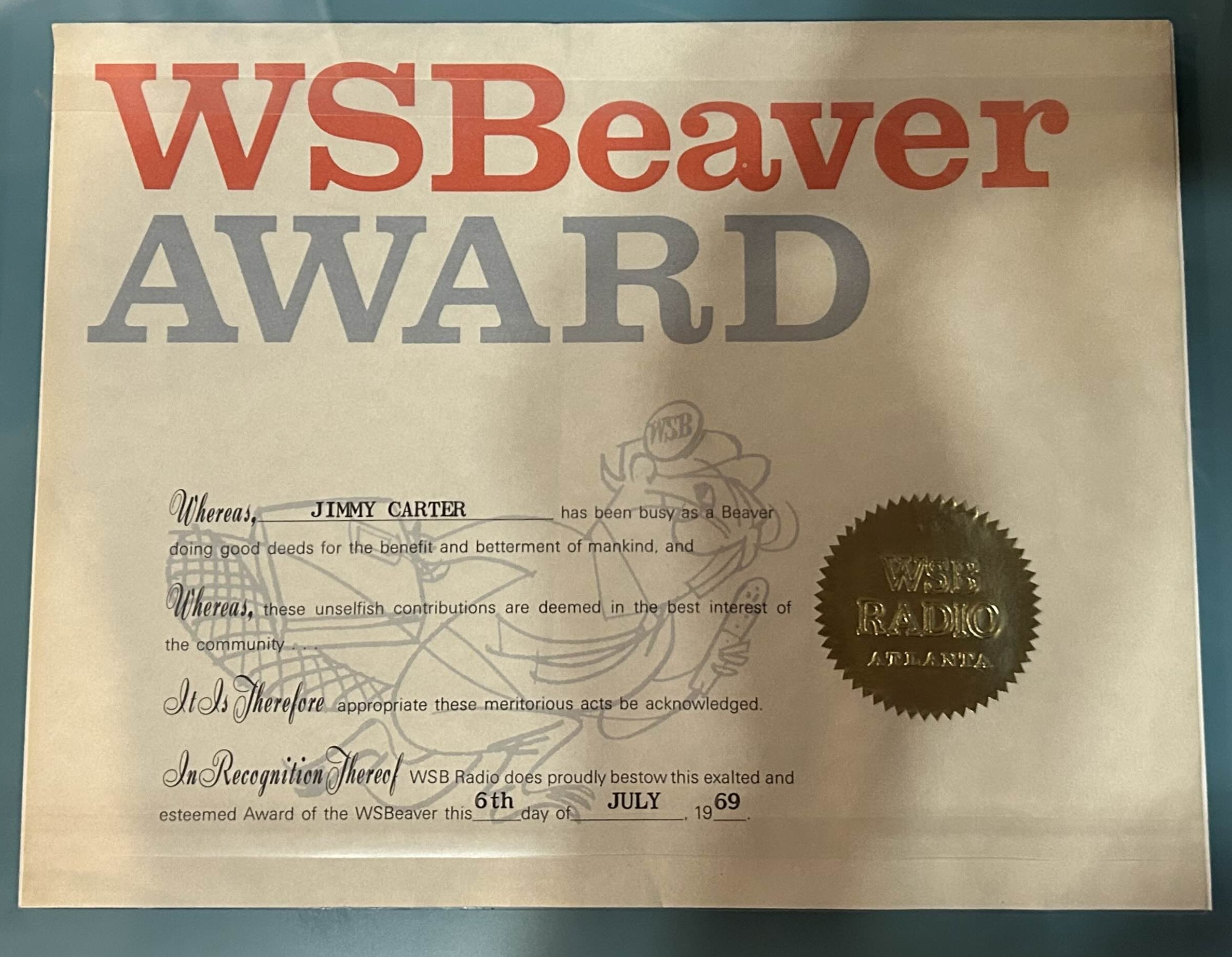
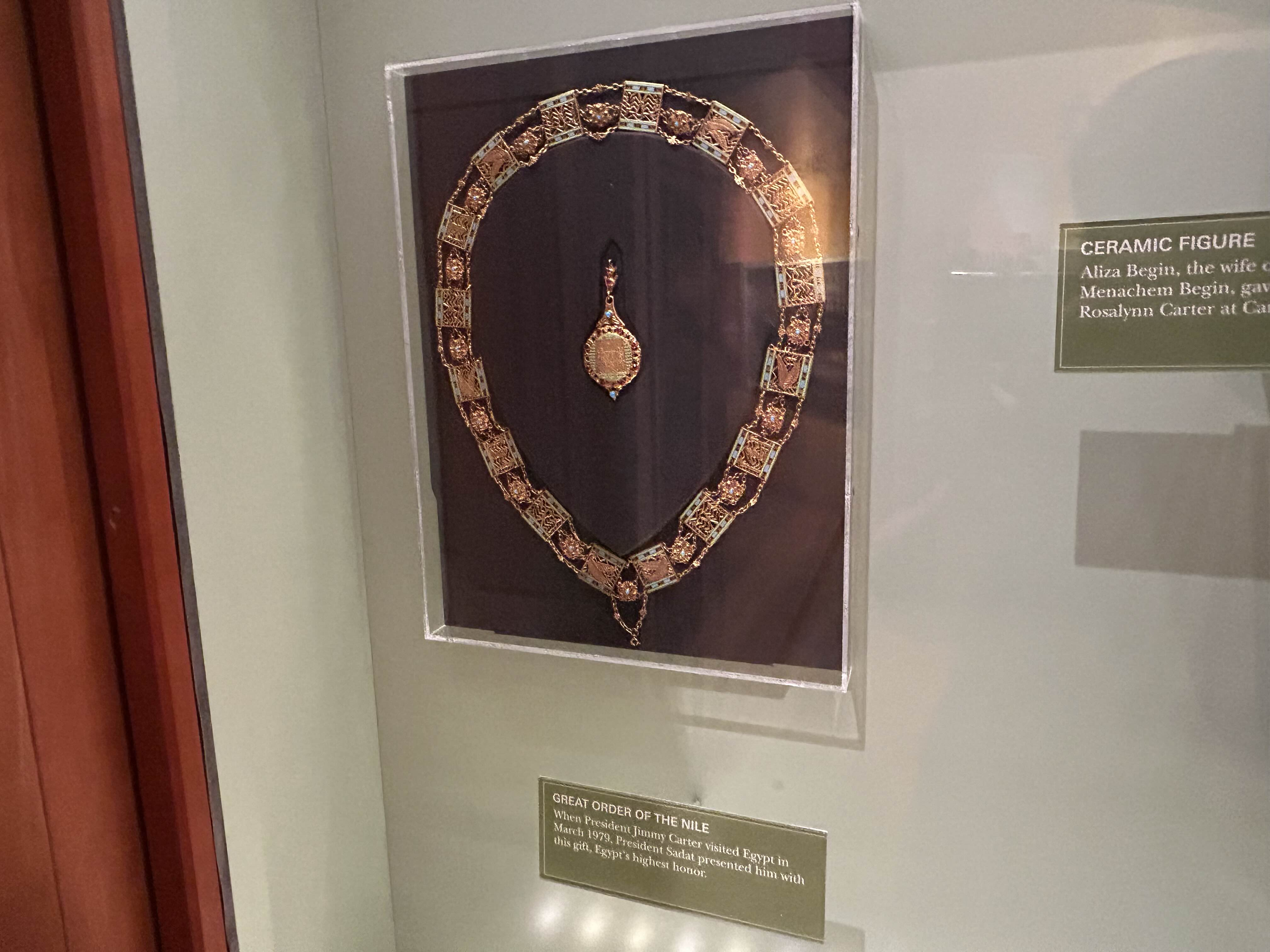
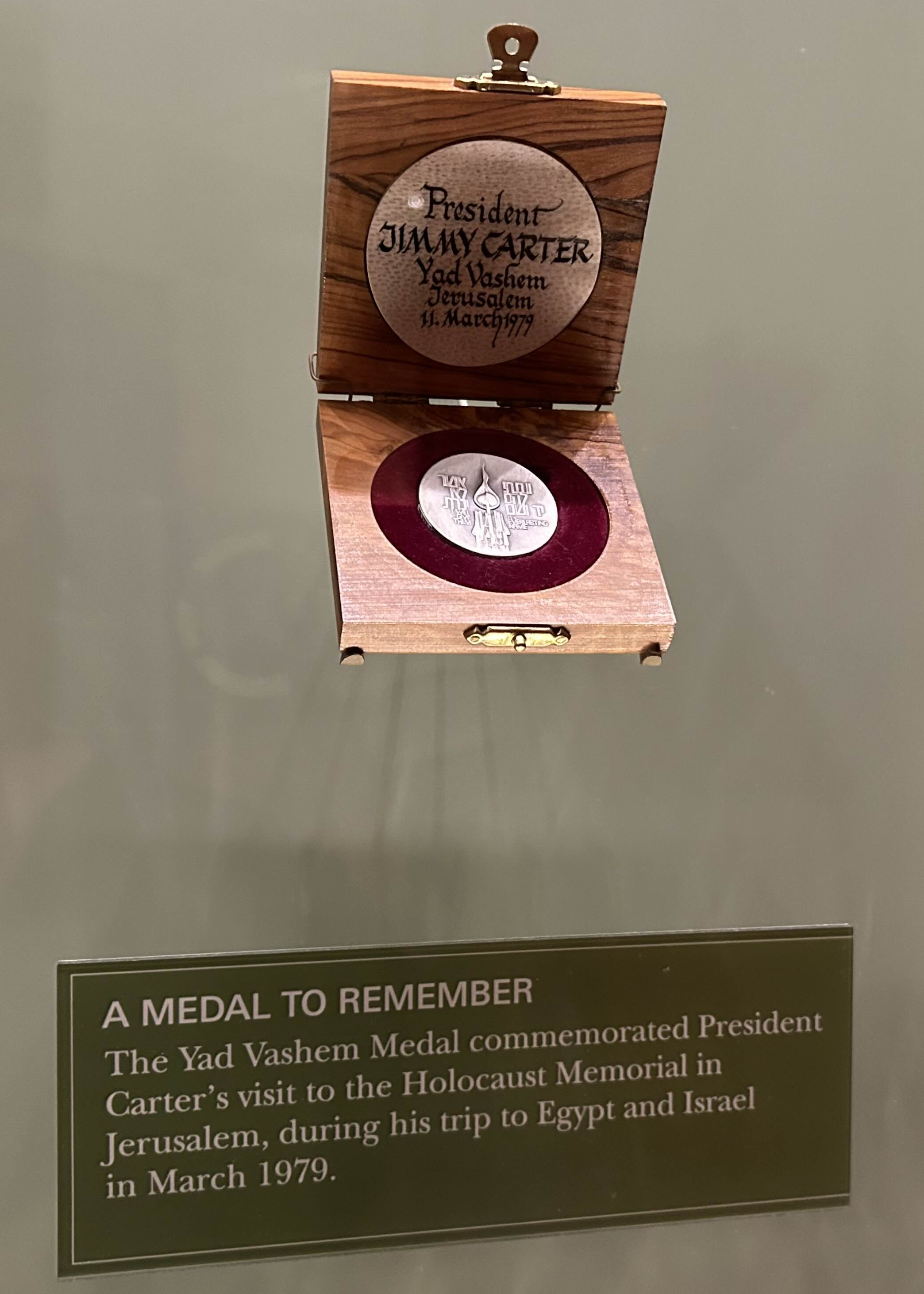
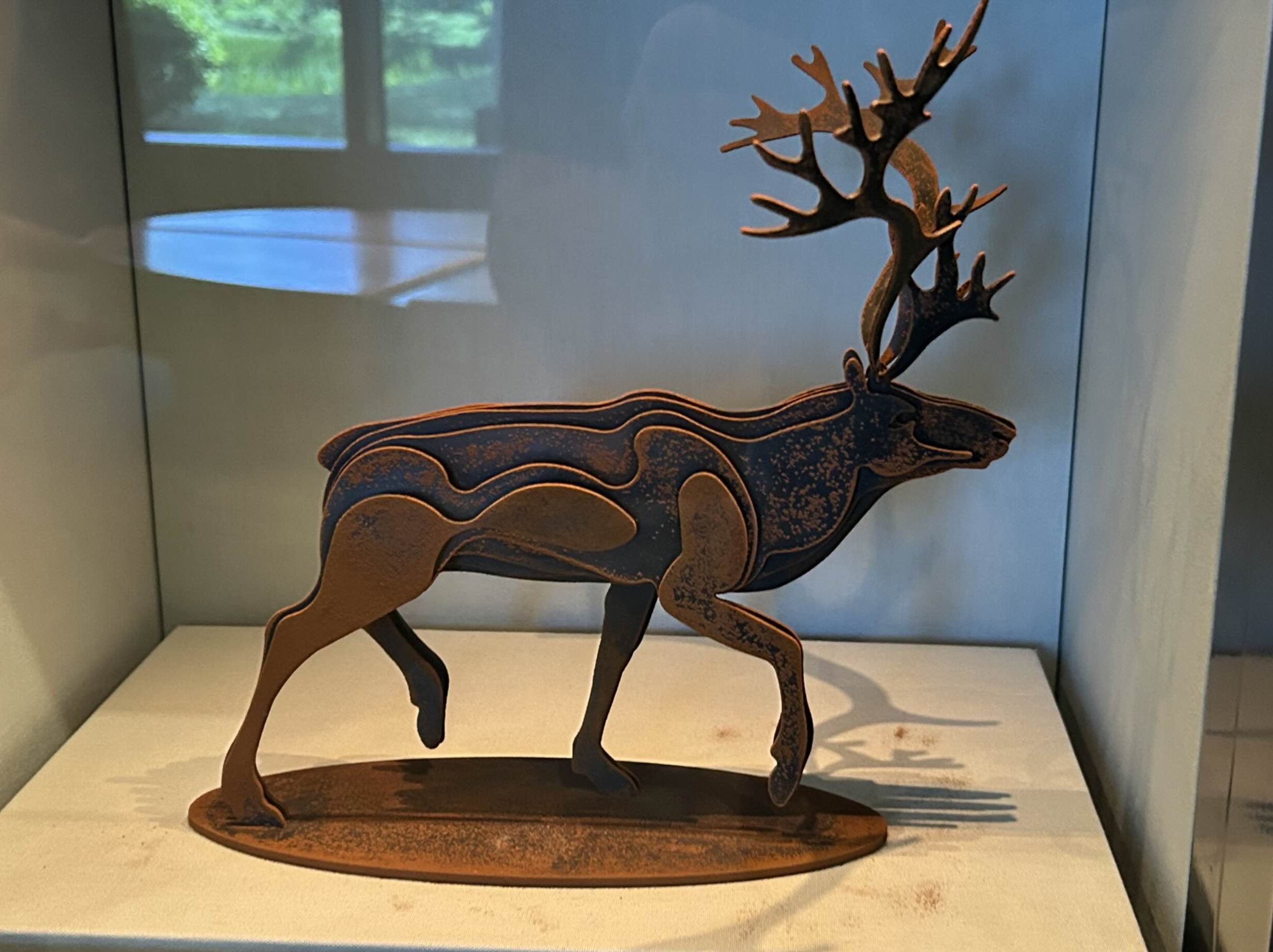
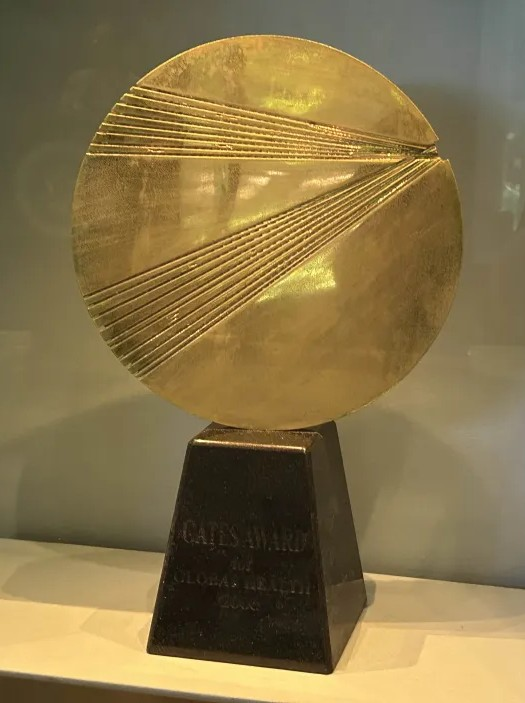
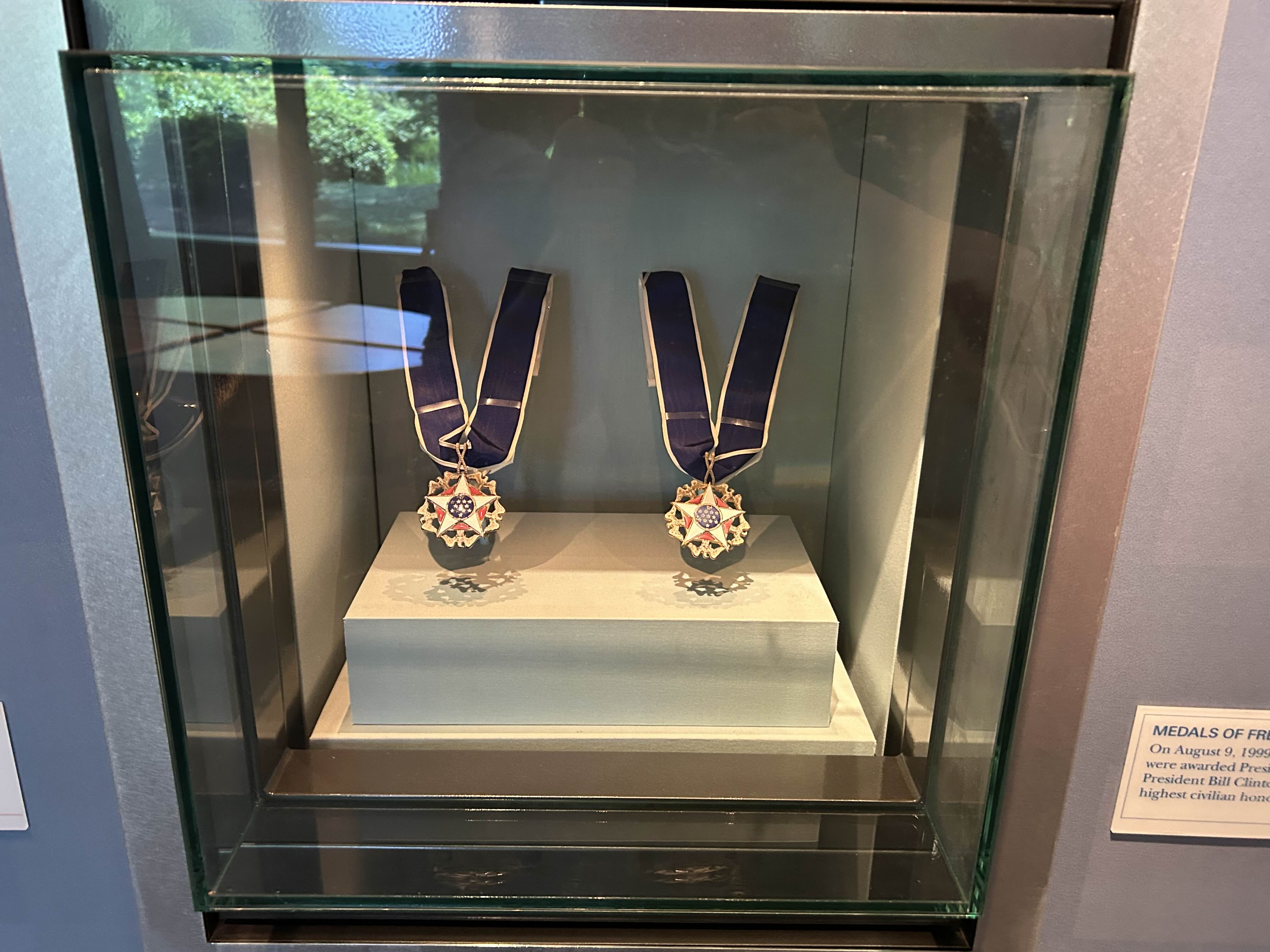
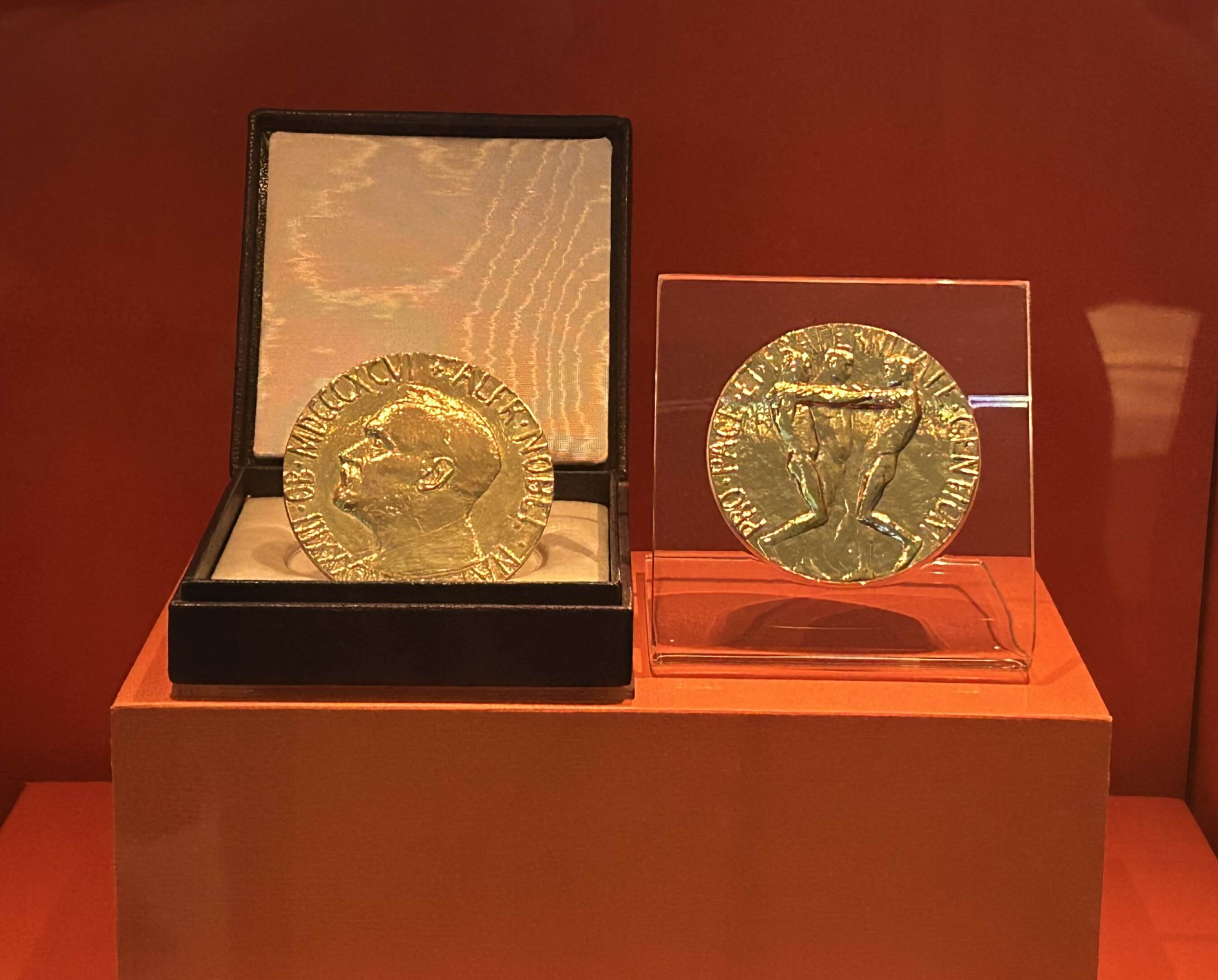
Various awards and honors received by Carter on display at the Jimmy Carter Library and Museum

Among the honors Carter received are the Presidential Medal of Freedom in 1999 and the Nobel Peace Prize in 2002. Others include:

- WSBeaver Award, WSB, 1969
- Freedom of the City of Newcastle upon Tyne, England, 1977
- Silver Buffalo Award, Boy Scouts of America, 1978
- Order of the Nile, 1979
- Gold Medal, International Institute for Human Rights, 1979
- International Mediation medal, American Arbitration Association, 1979
- Martin Luther King Jr., Nonviolent Peace Prize, 1979
- International Human Rights Award, Synagogue Council of America, 1979
- Foreign Language Advocate Award, Northeast Conference on the Teaching of Foreign Languages, 1979
- Conservationist of the Year Award, 1979
- Yad Vashem Medal, 1979
- Harry S. Truman Public Service Award, 1981
- Ansel Adams Conservation Award, Wilderness Society, 1982
- Human Rights Award, International League of Human Rights, 1983
- World Methodist Peace Award, 1985
- Albert Schweitzer Prize for Humanitarianism, 1987
- Edwin C. Whitehead Award, National Center for Health Education, 1989
- S. Roger Horchow Award for Greatest Public Service by a Private Citizen, Jefferson Awards, 1990
- Liberty Medal, National Constitution Center, 1990
- Spirit of America Award, National Council for the Social Studies, 1990
- Physicians for Social Responsibility Award, 1991
- Aristotle Prize, Alexander S. Onassis Foundation, 1991
- W. Averell Harriman Democracy Award, National Democratic Institute for International Affairs, 1992
- Spark M. Matsunaga Medal of Peace, US Institute of Peace, 1993
- Humanitarian Award, CARE International, 1993
- Conservationist of the Year Medal, National Wildlife Federation, 1993
- Audubon Medal, National Audubon Society, 1994
- American Library Association Honorary Membership, 1994.
- Rotary Award for World Understanding, 1994
- J. William Fulbright Prize for International Understanding, 1994
- National Civil Rights Museum Freedom Award, 1994
- UNESCO Félix Houphouët-Boigny Peace Prize, 1994
- Grand-Cross of the Order of Vasco Núñez de Balboa of Panama, 1995
- Four Freedoms Award; Freedom Medal, 1995
- Bishop John T. Walker Distinguished Humanitarian Award, Africare, 1996
- Humanitarian of the Year, GQ Awards, 1996
- Kiwanis International Humanitarian Award, 1996
- Indira Gandhi Prize for Peace, Disarmament and Development, 1997
- Jimmy and Rosalynn Carter Awards for Humanitarian Contributions to the Health of Humankind, National Foundation for Infectious Diseases, 1997
- United Nations Human Rights Award, 1998
- The Hoover Medal, 1998
- The Delta Prize for Global Understanding, Delta Air Lines & The University of Georgia, 1999
- International Child Survival Award, UNICEF Atlanta, 1999
- Presidential Medal of Freedom, 1999
- William Penn Mott Jr., Park Leadership Award, National Parks Conservation Association, 2000
- The Caribou Award, Alaska Wilderness League, 2000
- Zayed International Prize for the Environment, 2001
- Jonathan M. Daniels Humanitarian Award, VMI, 2001
- Herbert Hoover Humanitarian Award, Boys & Girls Clubs of America, 2001
- Christopher Award, 2002
- Pulitzer Prize Finalist in Biography or Autobiography, 2002
- Georgia Writers Hall of Fame, the University of Georgia, 2006
- Gates Award for Global Health, 2006
- Grammy Award for Best Spoken Word Album, National Academy of Recording Arts and Sciences, 2007
- Berkeley Medal, University of California campus, May 2, 2007
- International Award for Excellence and Creativity, Palestinian Authority, 2009
- Mahatma Gandhi Global Nonviolence Award, Mahatma Gandhi Center for Global Nonviolence, James Madison University (shared with his wife, Rosalynn Carter)
- Recipient of 2009 American Peace Award along with Rosalynn Carter
- Catalonia International Prize 2010
- Knight-Grand-Cross of the Order of the Crown of Belgium, by Royal Decree of King Albert II of the Belgians, 2011
- International Advocate for Peace award, Cardozo Journal of Conflict Resolution at Cardozo School of Law, 2013
- The O'Connor Justice Prize, 2015.
- The President's Medal, Emory University, 2015
- Liberty and Justice For All Award, LBJ Foundation, 2016
- Order of Manuel Amador Guerrero of Panama, 2016
- Grammy Award for Best Spoken Word Album, National Academy of Recording Arts and Sciences, 2016
- Georgia Hunting and Fishing Hall of Fame, 2016
- Grand Cross of the Order of the Liberator General San Martín, 2017
- Ivan Allen Jr. Prize for Social Courage, Georgia Institute of Technology, 2017
- Gerald R. Ford Medal for Distinguished Public Service, 2017
- Bill Foege Global Health Award, 2018
- Induction into the Georgia Agricultural Hall of Fame, the University of Georgia, 2018
- Grammy Award for Best Spoken Word Album, National Academy of Recording Arts and Sciences, 2019
- Tzedek v’Shalom award, J Street, 2021

== Namesakes ==
=== Carterpuri ===
The village of Carterpuri in the Indian state of Haryana was named after President Carter to mark his visit in 1978. Carter's mother Lillian had previously visited the community in the 1960s as a Peace Corps volunteer.

=== Navy submarine ===
In 1998, the U.S. Navy named the third and last Seawolf-class submarine the USS Jimmy Carter (SSN-23) in honor of former President Carter and his service as a submariner officer. It became one of the first Navy vessels to be named for a person living at the time of naming.

=== Fish species ===
In 2002, a fish species was given a scientific name after him, the bluegrass darter (Etheostoma jimmycarter), for his environmental leadership and accomplishments in the areas of national energy policy and wilderness protection, and his lifelong commitment to social justice and basic human rights.

=== U.S. Naval Academy building ===
In February 2023, the United States Naval Academy changed the name of its engineering building from Maury Hall to Carter Hall in honor of the former president and Naval Academy graduate. The building was previously named for Matthew Fontaine Maury, an oceanographer and U.S. naval officer who gave up his commission to fight against the United States by serving as a naval officer and diplomatic envoy to England for the Confederacy.

=== Music ===
In 2016, the indie rock band The Chairman Dances released a song entitled "Jimmy Carter". Its lyrics discuss Carter's wrestling with his faith in the Resurrection and ultimately finding comfort in bible verses Mark 9:23-4, the words of novelist Flannery O'Connor, and theologian Paul Tillich.

== Grammy Awards ==
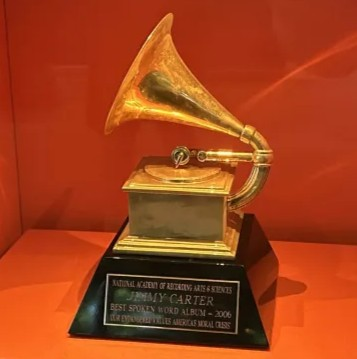
Carter's first Grammy Award on display in the Jimmy Carter Library and Museum

President Carter was nominated for the Grammy Awards ten times in the Best Spoken Word Album category, winning four times, once posthumously. He is most nominated and most awarded person in the category.

Year	Category	Nominated work	Result
1998	Best Spoken Word or Non-Musical Album	Living Faith	Nominated
1999	Best Spoken Word Album	The Virtues of Aging	Nominated
2002	Best Spoken Word Album	An Hour Before Daylight	Nominated
2007	Best Spoken Word Album	Our Endangered Values: America's Moral Crisis	Won
2008	Best Spoken Word Album	Sunday Mornings In Plains: Bringing Peace To A Changing World	Nominated
2010	Best Spoken Word Album	We Can Have Peace In The Holy Land	Nominated
2015	Best Spoken Word Album	A Call to Action	Nominated
2016	Best Spoken Word Album	A Full Life: Reflections at 90	Won
2019	Best Spoken Word Album	Faith - A Journey for All	Won
2025	Best Audio Book, Narration & Storytelling Recording	Last Sunday in Plains: A Centennial Celebration (Note: Won posthumously)	Won
