= Christoph Steidl Porenta =

Slovenian artist

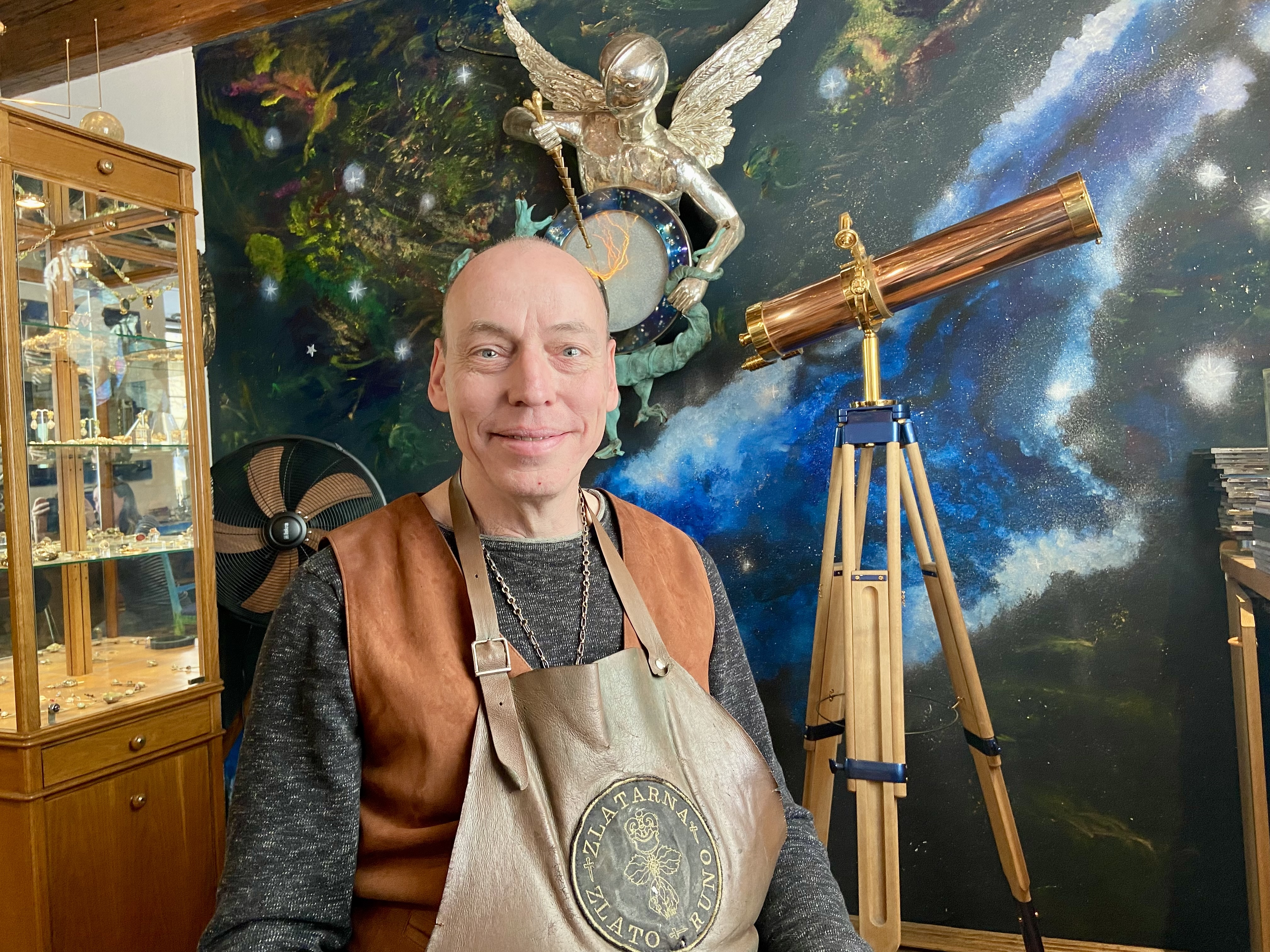
- Steidl Porenta in his workshop in 2024
- Born: 5 May 1965 (age 61); Munich, Bavaria, West Germany
- Education: Münsterschwarzach Abbey
- Occupations: Silversmith, goldsmith
- Known for: Being a knight of the Sovereign Order of Malta

Christoph Steidl Porenta (born 1965) is a silversmith and goldsmith who lives and works in Slovenia. He is a knight of the Sovereign Order of Malta.

== Early life ==
Steidl Porenta (born Schneck) was born in Munich, Bavaria in West Germany on 5 May 1965. He went to school in Pullach, became an industrial mechanic, and studied goldsmithing at Münsterschwarzach Abbey. He was inspired by the goldsmithing of René Lalique.

== Work ==
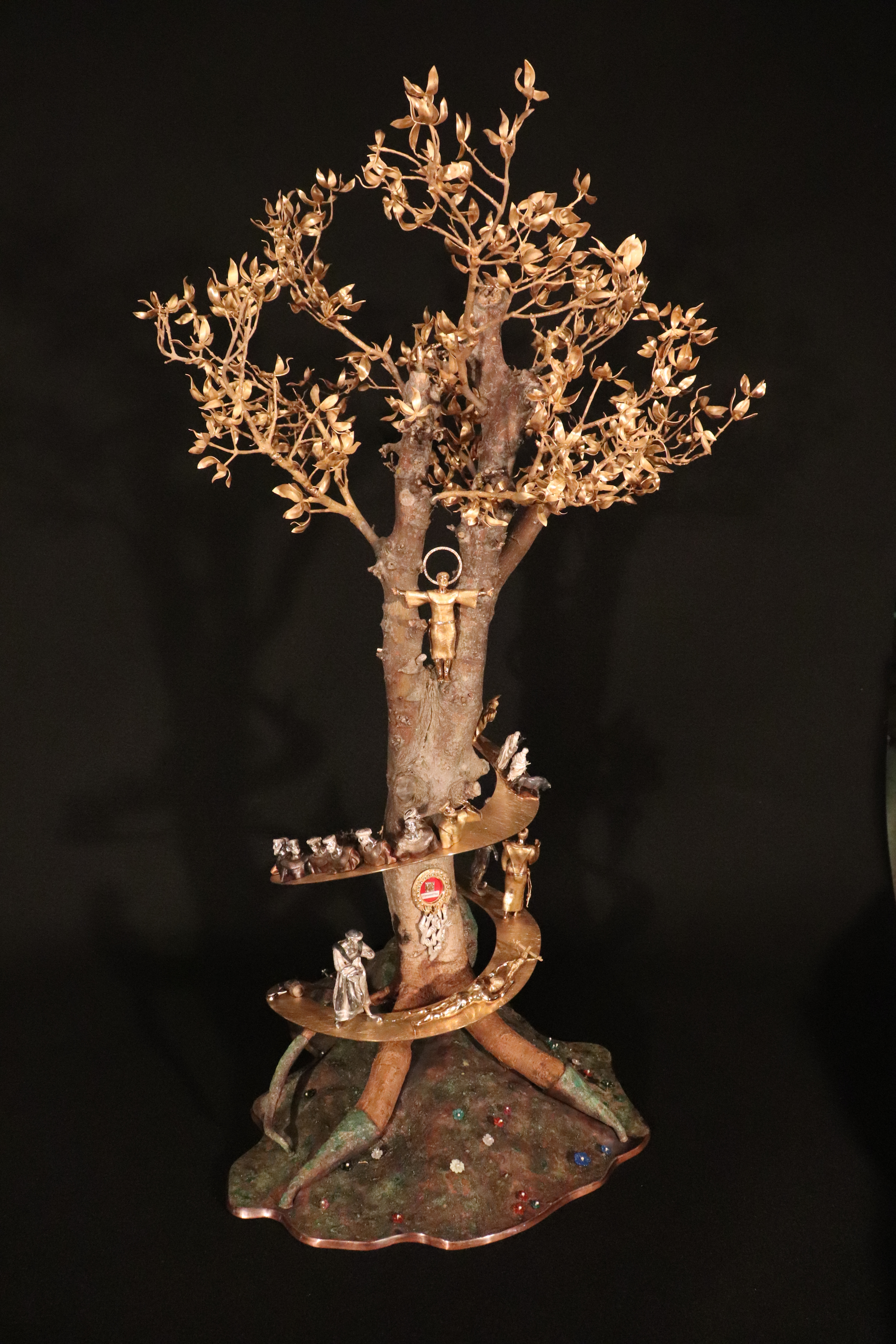
Reliquary to Francis of Assisi by Steidl Porenta

In addition to being a silversmith and goldsmith, Steidl Porenta works with restoration. Since 1993, he works in Ljubljana, Slovenia. His work has been exhibited in Germany, Italy and Slovenia and he is the only master silversmith in Slovenia. A journalist from Dnevnik said in 2019 that his works "surprise and inspire with their rich expressiveness and bear a modern stamp with a touch of the past, fairy tales, mysteries and a touch of anxiety, to counterbalance the perfection of beauty."

He has a shop and studio in Ljubljana, called Zlato runo (Golden fleece). His work include ecclesiastical rings, the hands of the clock of a cathedral, glasses, cups and sculptures. He has made a reliquary to Francis of Assisi for the Bazilika Marije Pomagaj in Brezje.

In 2017, he designed an exhibition at the National Gallery of Slovenia, celebrating the 800th anniversary of the Order of Malta in Slovenia. As of 2023, he has three apprentices, and says

It is important to me that each piece of jewelry is unique and something special. Today, it can quickly be devalued through mass production, but jewelry is a personal thing, the wearer expresses himself with it.

== Personal life ==
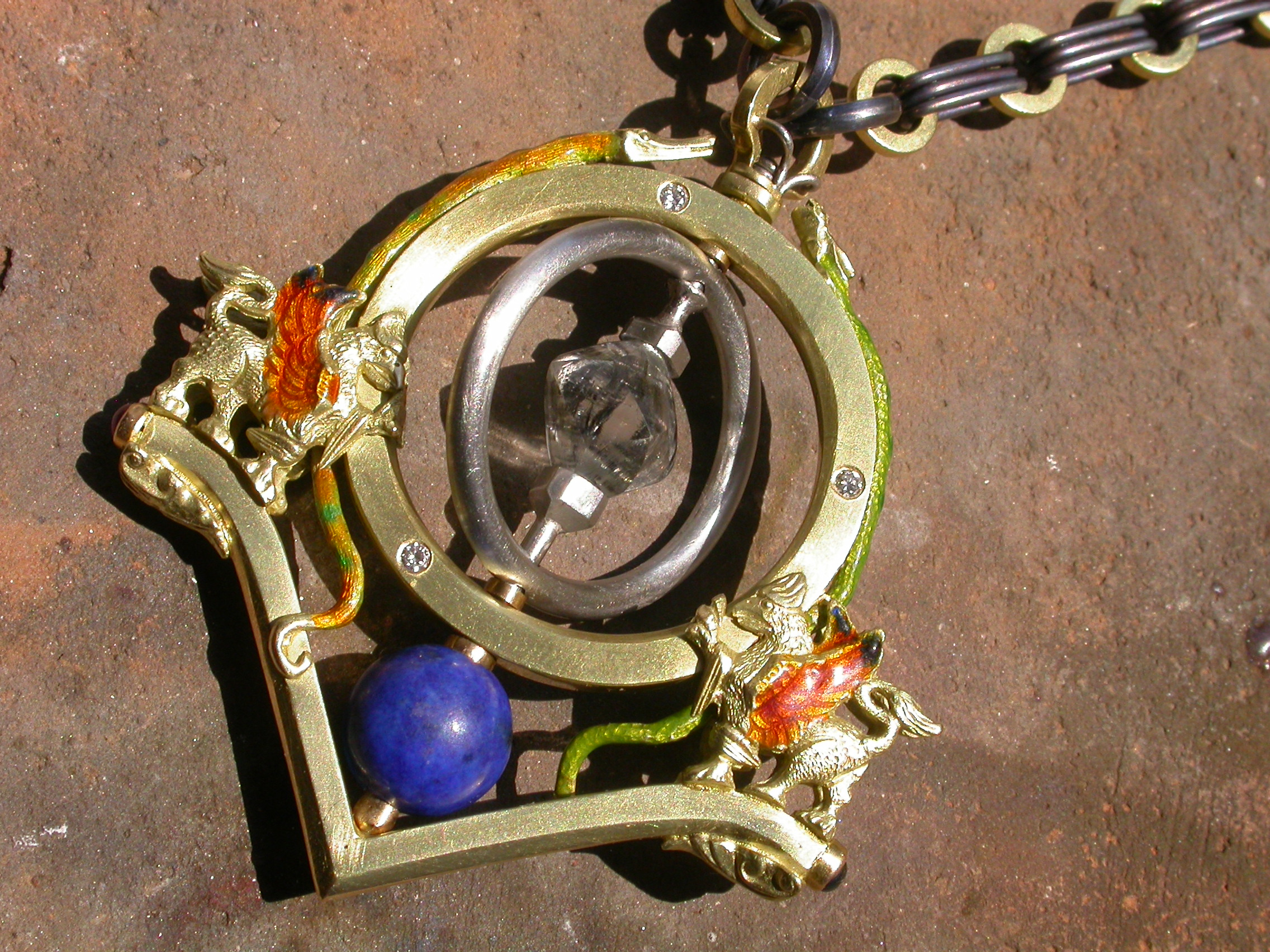
Pendant by Steidl Porenta. At the center is a diamond, flanked by griffins

Steidl Porenta moved to Slovenia since he had met a Slovenian woman and married her. He is a descendant of Melchior Steidl, (1657-1727), an Austrian baroque painter. As of 2023, he lives in Cerklje na Gorenjskem.

As of 2013, since the late 1990s, he had a pet raven named Orhan. Steidl Porenta said that the bird was a useful companion, since it would indicate around noon that it was hungry, and so remind Steidl Porenta that he should also eat something.

== Awards and honors ==
Steidl Porenta is a knight of the Sovereign Order of Malta.
