= Nancy Meek Pocock =

Canadian humanitarian (1910–1998)

Nancy Meek Pocock OOnt
- Born: Anne Dorothy Meek; October 24, 1910; Chicago, Illinois
- Died: March 4, 1998 (aged 87)

Nancy Meek Pocock, OOnt (October 24, 1910 – March 4, 1998), known as "Mama Nancy", was a Canadian Quaker who was the 1987 recipient of the Pearson Medal of Peace for her work in disarmament, development and feminism. She was awarded the Order of Ontario in 1992.

== Biography ==
=== Early life and career ===
Nancy Pocock was born in Chicago as Anne Dorothy Meek. She was raised in both Illinois and Pennsylvania but by the age of ten had settled with her family in Toronto where she lived until her death in 1998. After graduating from Central Technical School she studied at the Ontario College of Art.

Advertisement from the Canadian Review of Music and Art, April 1942

In 1930, she studied design and bench work in Paris, and upon returning to Toronto opened a jewellery studio on Gerrard Street which she shared with potter and friend Nunzio D'Angelo. Pocock (with Harold Stacey) was one of the founding directors of the Metal Arts Guild of Ontario and the only one to be described as a "silversmith" in its letters patent. Her work was included as part of the craft component for the Canadian Pavilion in the Universal and International Exhibition in Brussels in 1958. She later moved her studio to Yorkville, where she worked until 1970.

Pocock married her husband, Jack (John) Pocock, in 1944. While he served in World War II, she joined the Canadian Society of Friends (the Quakers), and soon he became a member as well. They helped establish the Grindstone Island programs, a series of seminars devoted to tackling the problems of war through peaceful means.

Pocock was also a founding member of the Voice of Women and Project Ploughshares and was involved with the Canadian Peace Research Institute, the Canadian Campaign for Nuclear Disarmament and a variety of Quaker peace projects including the Canadian Friends Service Committee. She was also a Quaker representative to the Inter-Church Committee on Refugees (ICCR) and co-ordinator of Toronto Refugee Affairs Council. Pocock committed much of her time to working with refugees during the Vietnam War by helping American draft dodgers and deserters as well as Vietnamese refugees find homes in Canada. She visited Vietnam four times, the first time during the war as a member of a Quaker committee sending aid to Vietnam. After the death of her husband in 1975, her work with refugees intensified and she expanded her scope of interest to include refugees from Latin and Central America.

Nancy Pocock was awarded the Medal of Friendship by Vietnam in 1978, the Pearson Peace Medal in 1987, an honorary doctorate of divinity from Queen's University at Kingston in 1990, and the Order of Ontario in 1992.

=== Death ===
At age 86, she stated she would not retire. And indeed, she never did. Lying on a bed in the Emergency unit just days before she died, she continued to sign documents for an Iranian refugee. She died on March 4, 1998.
