= Crafts Council of British Columbia =

Non-profit organization in British Columbia

Craft Council of British Columbia
- Abbreviation: CCBC
- Formation: 1972; 54 years ago
- Type: Non-profit organization
- Headquarters: 1386 Cartwright Street Vancouver, British Columbia
- Region served: British Columbia
- Executive Director: Raine Mckay
- Website: https://craftcouncilbc.ca

The Craft Council of British Columbia (CCBC) is a non-profit, charitable arts service organization based in Vancouver, British Columbia. The CCBC works with fine craft professionals and local, provincial and national arts organizations to promote the development of excellence in crafts. The organization also operates a public gallery and retail shop on Granville Island.

== History ==
The CCBC, formerly the Craftsmen's Association of British Columbia, was created in recognition of a growing craft community by members of the Visual Arts Committee of the Community Arts Council of Vancouver. The organization's first office and exhibition space was located in the Dominion Building in downtown Vancouver. In December 1979, the CCBC relocated to Granville Island.

== Programs ==
The CCBC offers a number of programs and services designed to promote fine crafts, educate the public on fine craft practices and trends, meet the needs of its membership, craftspeople/artisans, educators, students and the general public. The CCBC is the only craft-focused arts service organization in BC that fulfills an educational and public mandate along with regional and national objectives.

A list of programs currently offered at CCBC:

- Craft Vignettes, a community-based crafts program providing demonstrations and educational sessions
- Small Business Round-table seminars, providing resources and guidance to craftspeople at various stages of their careers
- Mentorships for professionals and students; the program pairs individuals of the same media together for a period of 5 months. Mentee is guided by artisan level mentor in the skills-building capacity, either on existing work or new work.

== Highlights and achievements ==
- the signature "Made by Hand" exhibitions showcasing the best in fine crafts that started in 1976 until the late 1990s.
- partnership with the Canadian Crafts Federation to produce the largest-ever crafts festival throughout Canada, Craft Year 2007, and presenting a province-wide exhibition (90 artists) and related programming with the Roundhouse Community Arts and Recreation Centre and Vancouver Museum.
- collaborating with CCF and other provincial craft councils on an Asian trade mission to the Cheongju International Craft Biennale 2007 and preparing for Canada Pavilion in 2009, South Korea and Vancouver 2010 Winter Olympics.
- branding and marketing BC's fine crafts to an international audience and including crafts as value-added attractions to draw more audiences to Vancouver and BC.

== Notable craftspeople from British Columbia ==
- Robin Hopper – Canadian ceramicist (1939–2017)
- Charmian Johnson – Canadian potter (1939–2020)
- Walter Dexter – Canadian ceramicist (1931–2015)
- Carol Sabiston – Canadian textile artist (1939–2026)
