= Douglas Moerdyke Duncan =

Canadian art dealer (1902–1968)

Douglas Moerdyke Duncan (1902–1968) was a Canadian art dealer and collector. He was an early promoter of Canadian art.

== Early life ==
Duncan was born in 1902 to Fannie Elizabeth Moerdyke and Smith Frederick Duncan. He grew up in the Forest Hill of Toronto, Ontario. After attending school in his native city, he left for Paris in 1925 and trained as a bookbinder.

== Career ==
After completing his education in Toronto and Paris, Duncan managed a bookbinding studio in Toronto. In 1936, he became a founding member of the experimental Picture Loan Society, which offered artworks for rental by the month and sponsored numerous small exhibitions every year. It focused exclusively on living Canadian artists. Artists on its roster included Carl Schaefer, L.L. Fitzgerald, "Scottie" Wilson, Harold Town, Paul-Emile Borduas, Isabel McLaughlin, and Bertram Brooker.

Duncan particularly admired the work of David Milne, who he sought out from the Muskoka wilderness, eventually becoming his agent in 1938.

== Art collection ==
Since becoming the sole administrator of the Picture Loan Society in 1940, Duncan amassed a collection of over 4,000 works of Canadian art, including a significant number of works by Milne. After his death in 1968, his sister, Frances Duncan Barwick, distributed his art collection to 42 public museums or university art collections across Canada, and to the Canadian Cultural Centre in Paris.
