= L. Brent Kington =

American art educator and visual artist

- Born: July 26, 1934; Topeka, Kansas
- Died: February 7, 2013 (aged 78); Carbondale, Illinois
- Known for: metalsmithing
- Movement: studio craft movement in jewelry and hollowware

L. Brent Kington (July 26, 1934 – February 7, 2013) was an art educator and visual artist who worked in blacksmithing and sculpture. Kington was a product of the studio craft movement in jewelry and hollowware. In 1969 he served as the first president of the Society of North American Goldsmiths. He is frequently hailed as the man responsible for the blacksmithing revival which took place in the late 1960s and early 1970s.

== Biography and career ==
Kington taught at Southern Illinois University Carbondale from 1961 to 1997 where he mentored an entire generation of metalsmiths including, especially, Gary Lee Noffke. When the Southern Illinois University Smithy was renovated in 2003, it was renamed the L. Brent Kington Smithy in his honor. He was a very influential artist with over 370 exhibitions and with works displayed at many galleries, including the Southern Illinois Art & Artisan Center, the Lockport Gallery at the Illinois State Museum, the Philadelphia Museum of Art, National Museum of American Art, the National Ornamental Metal Museum, Smithsonian Institution, and The Mint Museum in Charlotte, North Carolina. There was a major exhibition of his work in March 2010 at the Illinois State Museum in Springfield.

== Honors and awards ==
Kington received the honor of Master Metalsmith in 1984 from the National Ornamental Metal Museum in Memphis, TN. Kington received fellowships from The National Endowment for the Arts (1975 and 1982) and the Illinois Arts Council (1985). His awards include the Gold Medal from the American Craft Council (2000), the Lifetime Member Award by the Artist-Blacksmiths Association of North America (2006), the Outstanding Artist Educator Award by the Penland School of Crafts (2009), and the Lifetime Achievement Award by the Society of North American Goldsmiths (2011).
