= Society of North American Goldsmiths =

Jewelers and metal artists organization in North America

- Formation: 1969
- Headquarters: Eugene, Oregon
- Region served: United States and Canada
- Official language: English
- Website: snagmetalsmith.org

The Society of North American Goldsmiths (SNAG) is an organization of jewelers and metal artists in North America. It is located in Eugene, Oregon.

== Foundation ==
The Society of North American Goldsmiths (SNAG) was founded in Chicago in 1969. An initial meeting took place in 1968 of Robert Ebendorf, Phillip Fike, Hero Kielman, L. Brent Kington, Stanley Lechtzin, Kurt Matzdorf, Ronald Hayes Pearson, and Olaf Skoogfors. A second meeting took place in January 1969 in Boston, Massachusetts, with Hans Christensen, Fred Fenster, Arline Fisch, Michael Jerry, Orland Larson, Miye Matsukata, Ronald McNeish, John Prip, Richard Thomas, Harold Stacey, Barry Merritt, and Ed Wiener among others. After this, SNAG was founded. SNAG was formed to create a structure for conferences and exhibitions. In 1970, it held its first conference in Saint Paul, Minnesota. The same year, it held its first exhibition at the Minnesota Museum of Art.

== Activities ==
The organization provides workshops, competitions, and lectures to its membership. It also provides an environment for contemporary jewelers and metalsmiths to share information.

== Publications ==
SNAG published various newsletters starting in 1975. In 1980, SNAG began producing a quarterly magazine entitled Metalsmith. It is currently published five times a year.
