= Delta Prize for Global Understanding =

Joint award by Delta Air Lines and the University of Georgia

The Delta Prize for Global Understanding, presented annually by Delta Air Lines and the University of Georgia, recognizes individuals or groups whose initiatives have helped promote world peace as well as globally significant efforts that provide opportunities for greater understanding among nations and cultures. Such efforts can include grassroots projects that diminish hostilities in a particular part of the world, international programs that promote communication or trade among different peoples, and/or leadership that inspires global cooperation and peace.

The prize includes a $10,000 cash grant and an original work of art designed by Barbara Mann and Gary Lee Noffke of the University of Georgia's Lamar Dodd School of Art .

== Laureates ==
Year	Person	Country
1999	Jimmy Carter	United States
1999	Rosalynn Carter	United States
1999	Carter Center	United States
2000	Desmond Tutu	South Africa
2001	Mihail Gorbachev	Russia
2002	Sadako Ogata	Japan
2004	Václav Havel	Czech Republic
2005	Gertrude Mongella	Tanzania
2006	Ted Turner	United States
2007	Nelson Mandela	South Africa
2008	Martti Ahtisaari	Finland
2009	Mohamed ElBaradei	Egypt
2012	Roméo Dallaire	Canada
