= Canadian Crafts Federation =

The Canadian Crafts Federation (Fédération canadienne des métiers d'art) is the national arts service organization representing both the provincial and territorial craft councils and persons participating in the Canadian crafts sector.

== History ==
Since 1900, there has been a national craft organization in Canada. The foundation of the Canadian Guild of Crafts in that year heralded the beginning of nationwide cooperation in the crafts sector. In 1974, the Guild merged with other craft organizations and associations to create the Canadian Crafts Council (CCC), which "oversaw the institution of high-profile awards like the Saidye Bronfman Award and lobbied for the presence of craft experts and the inclusion of craft objects in realms previously reserved for "art," such as Canada's national museums and galleries and the Canada Council."

== Projects ==
Major projects by the CCF/FCMA include large scale market studies (such as the Canadian Fine Craft Niche Market Study and the Profile and Development Strategy for Craft in Canada) as well as national and international collaborative projects (such as the Craft Year 2007 festival).

In the fall of 2009, the CCF/FCMA spearheaded the largest exhibition of Canadian contemporary fine craft ever compiled, 'Unity & Diversity'. This exhibition of 212 works by 206 artists was displayed in its entirety at the Cheongju Arts Centre in the Canadian Pavilion at the 2009 Cheongju International Craft Biennale in Cheongju, South Korea. Canada was the special guest country for 2009, which had the CCF/FCMA and the Biennale working together on special lectures, presentations, demonstrations, tours, an educational lounge and a special boutique. Over 300,000 visitors attended the events, which ran from September 23 to November 1, 2009.

Selected Works from 'Unity & Diversity' went on to be displayed at the Museum of Vancouver as one of three exhibitions in a triptych of shows titled 'Art of Craft'. 72 pieces from the original 'Unity & Diversity' exhibition were showcased alongside 'By Hand', an exhibition of fine craft from British Columbia and the Yukon, as well as 'Moments In Between', an exhibition of fine craft from South Korea. The show was a featured event of the 2010 Cultural Olympiad for the 2010 Winter Olympic Games in Vancouver.

== See also ==
- Crafts Association of British Columbia
