= Metal Museum =

Metalwork museum in Memphis, Tennessee

- Slogan: Be the Spark

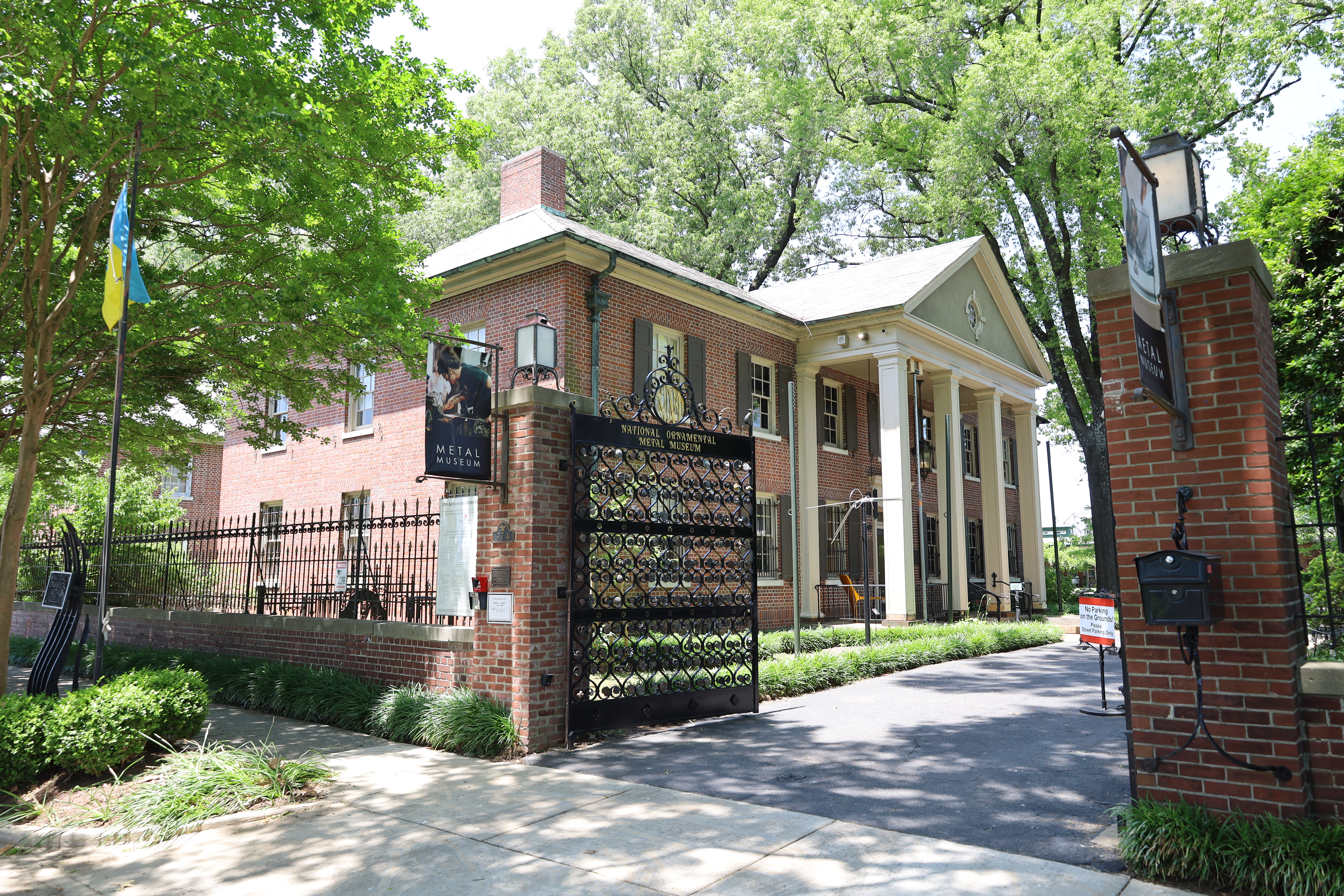
- Entrance to the museum
- Location: Memphis, Tennessee, U.S.
- Coordinates: 35°07′24″N 90°04′30″W
- Founder: National Ornamental Metal Museum 060523.jpg
- Website: www.metalmuseum.org

The Metal Museum, formerly called the National Ornamental Metal Museum, is a museum in Memphis, Tennessee. Founded by artist-blacksmith James Wallace, the museum is devoted to exhibitions of metalwork and public programs featuring metalsmiths.

== History ==
=== Original location ===
==== Marine Hospital ====
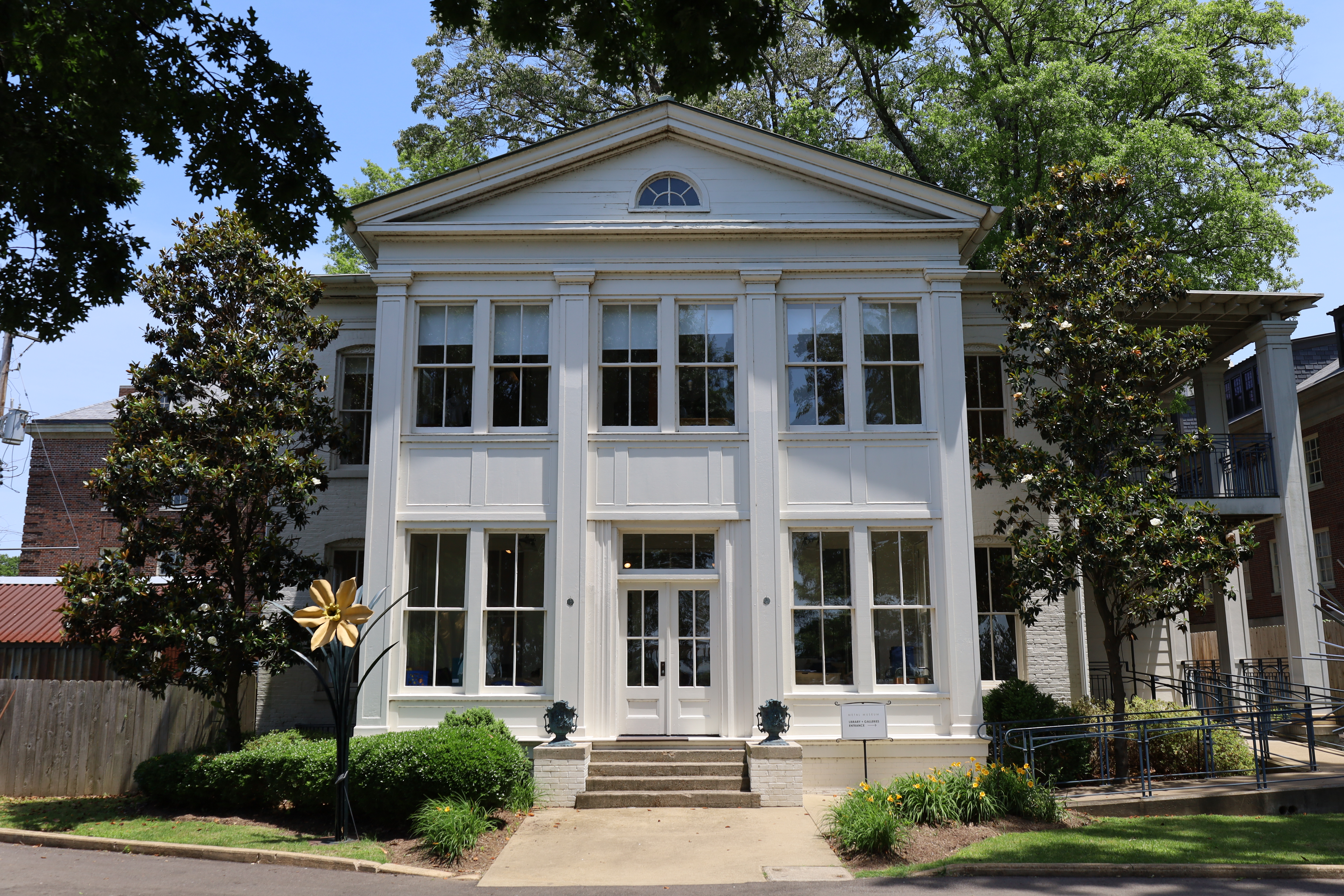
The Metal Museum's exhibit space is housed in buildings that were formerly part of the Memphis U.S. Marine Hospital

The Metal Museum was originally a hospital. The historic hospital first opened in 1884. This hospital's main use was treating civil war patients; however, it was also used as a scientific research center to explore cures for yellow fever.

The hospital's grounds originally comprised six buildings: a stable, a surgeon's house, two wards, a nurse's building, and an executive building. Only the nurse's building and executive building remain in their most original forms. The rest were demolished by the Works Progress Administration (WPA), a New Deal program, in the 1930s. The two surviving buildings were moved with wagons and mules, while other buildings were added to the estate.

==== Metal Museum ====
In the 1960s the hospital closed. According to the museum's website the ownership was transferred to the City of Memphis by the Heritage and Conservation Act, which eventually led to the Metal Museum gaining the lease.

Jim Wallace was hired to oversee the Metal Museum in about 1977. Since 1979, much work and money has gone into renovation to make the Metal Museum an interactive place for learning. About $2.5 million went into creating the blacksmith's shop, the Lawler Foundry; and the repair and restoration lab; constructing a gazebo; and restoring the library. Wallace led the museum for almost thirty years, and under his guidance the museum became a place for artist residencies, an official museum, and a library. He retired in 2007, after completing the renovations, to pursue his own work.

=== New home ===
In May 2022, the museum signed a lease on the site of the former Memphis College of Art in Overton Park in Midtown, Memphis.

On September 5, 2026, The Metal Museum at Overton Park opened the doors to its new home. Visitors can experience exhibitions, explore the Permanent Collection, see artists working in the Metals Studios, participate in hands-on classes, demonstrations, and other education and community engagement programs, and begin their own collections through the Museum Store.

The former downtown home, now referred to as Metal Museum on the Bluff, will expand the Museum’s commitment to artists through an artist residency program and future public engagement opportunities to come in 2027.

== Exhibits ==
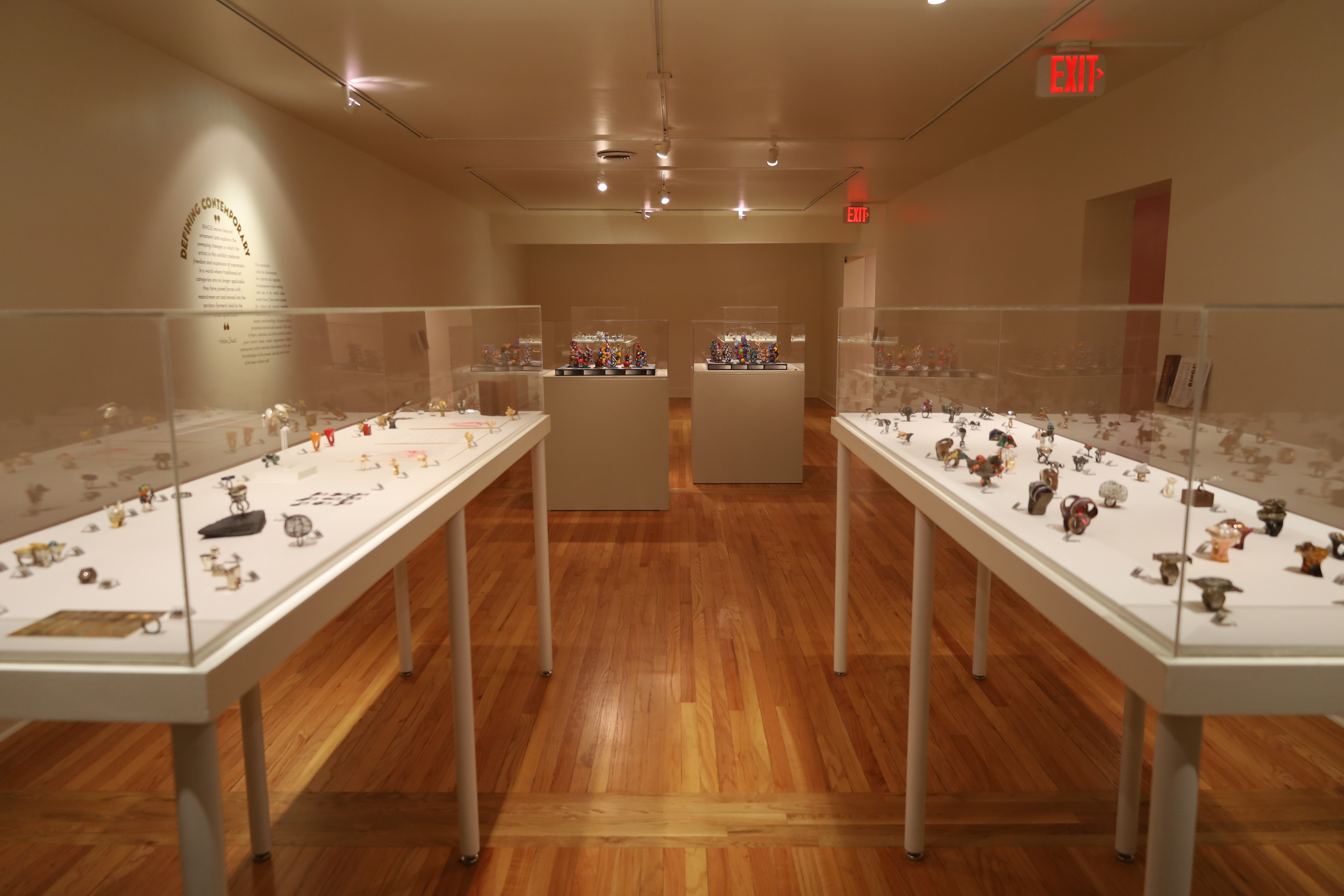
Exhibit space in the museum in 2022

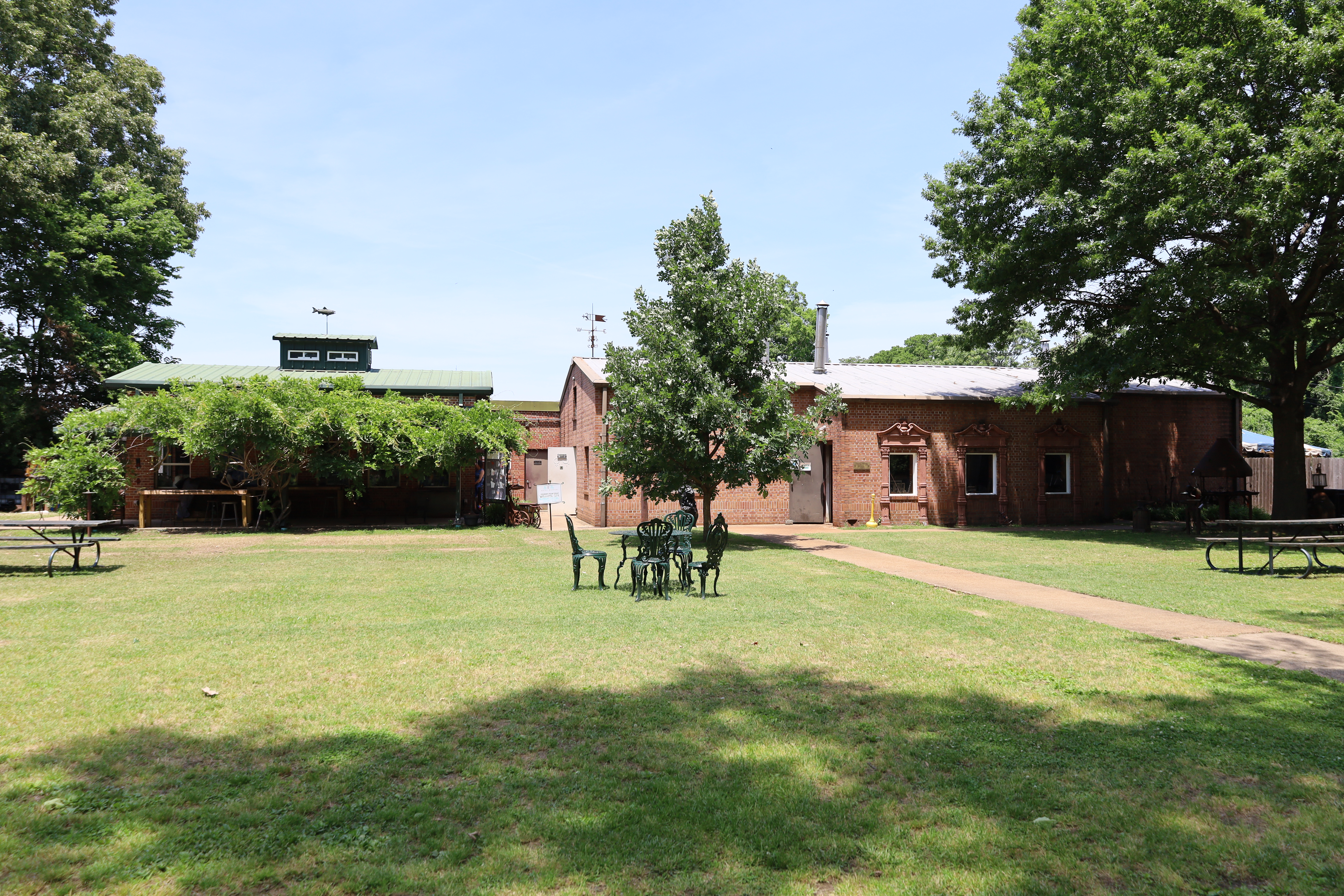
The museum's foundry and smithy in 2022

The museum has over 3,000 items in its permanent collection, and it hosts roatating exhibitions. There is also a working smithy and foundry on site. In addition to the displays of metalwork inside the museum, hands-on classes are available in the museum's workshops.

== Repair Days ==
Every fall, the Metal Museum holds a Repair Days Weekend. During this event, volunteer metalsmiths from across the country repair virtually any sort of metal object while the public watches.

== See also ==
- List of museums in Tennessee
