= Lauren Fensterstock =

American artist, writer, curator, critic and educator

- Born: March 10, 1975; Towson, Maryland
- Education: BFA: Parsons School of Design; MFA: SUNY New Paltz
- Spouse: Aaron T Stephan

Lauren Fensterstock is an American artist, writer, curator, critic, and educator living and working in Portland, Maine. Fensterstock’s work has been widely shown nationally at venues such as the John Michael Kohler Art Center (WI), the Bowdoin College Museum of Art (ME), the Portland Museum of Art (ME), and is held in public and private collections throughout the U.S., Europe, and Asia.

== Education ==
Fensterstock received her Bachelor of Fine Arts from Parsons School of Design in New York, New York in 1997 where she studied with Lisa Gralnick. She went on to receive her Master of Fine Arts from SUNY-New Paltz in New Paltz, New York in 2000 where she studied with Myra Mimlitsch-Gray and Jamie Bennett.

== Professional experience ==
Fensterstock currently works as a critic at the Rhode Island School of Design (RISD) in the graduate Jewelry + Metalsmithing department. Fensterstock has held previous teaching appointments at the Maine College of Art, New Hampshire Institute of Art, Vermont College, SUNY New Paltz, and as a visiting critic for several institutions. Fensterstock served as professorial chair at the Lamar Dodd School of Art during the 2017-2018 academic year. Along with teaching, Fensterstock also worked in an administrative capacity, and served as the Academic Director of the MFA program at the Maine College of Art from 2010-2012.

Fensterstock has worked as a curator throughout her career. Most notably she served as the interim director at the Institute of Contemporary Art at the Maine College of Art, the director of Hay Gallery (Portland, ME), as the Exhibitions Developer for the Saco Museum (Saco, ME), and as a guest curator for several exhibitions nationwide.

Fensterstock has written for a variety of publications including Metalsmith Magazine, Maine Magazine, Art New England, Maine Arts Magazine, and numerous catalog essays. In addition to writing, Fensterstock served as the Maine State Editor for Art New England from 2005-2007, and the Associate Editor for Arts Guide Portland from 2005-2007.

== Selected series and artwork ==
=== Precious Heirlooms 2004-2010 ===
Fensterstock’s training in metalsmithing and jewelry dominated her early work that centered on conversations about adornment, beauty, preciousness, and ephemerality. In her series Precarious Heirlooms, Fensterstock utilized such materials as potatoes, bananas, and soap, setting precious stones and pearls in the materials. The temporary nature of these base materials changed the pieces over time; the soap dried and cracked, the potatoes shriveled and grew tendril-like sprouts, and the banana rotted, turning black and deflated. Fensterstock documented these changes, referring to them as What Happens.

=== Third Nature 2007-2014 ===
Fensterstock’s long-running series, Third Nature utilized the process of quilling (curling and shaping fine strips of paper that construct decorative designs) which she combined with material such as Plexiglas and charcoal to create enclosed standalone sculptures. After purchasing her first home, Fensterstock was struck by how specific her ideas on how her garden “should” be. This led Fensterstock to research historic landscape design and theory, how people have interacted with the land through such implements as the Claude Glass, and how people actively shape the land around them. The result of this research is Fensterstock’s series Third Nature which is marked by its “monochromatic iterations of nature and gardens” that are enclosed and contained in various boxes, vitrines, and wall panels.

=== Installations 2008-2014 ===
Fensterstock built upon the research and themes of Third Nature in a series of site-specific installation projects. Fensterstock installed and showed these projects at such venues as the Bowdoin College Museum of Art, Walker Contemporary, the Ogunquit Museum of American Art, and the John Michael Kohler Arts Center. Fensterstock’s shift in scale accommodated additional influences and conversations such as the influences of minimalist artist Donald Judd and land artist Robert Smithson.

=== Grottoes 2014-2018 ===
This body of Fensterstock's work moved away from the quilled floral designs that marked her long-running Third Nature series and her installation work, and towards "cavernous pieces that imitate stalagmites and stalactites." Fensterstock explains the impetus for the shift in work for Interview Magazine:

For the last few years, I've been doing a lot of work with paper and looking at the history of garden designs, the ways different styles represent different ideas about man's role in the world. The differences between a Baroque garden and a picturesque garden represent two completely different world views. I kept coming across garden grottoes, which are artificial caves, and I became obsessed with them because it's this blend of culture and nature. It's in a natural space, but it's really an augmented natural space. Sometimes they would take, in the 18th century, a cave and reform it, cover the entire surface with shells or another kind of ornament, and create a space that really merged nature and culture.

With this new body of work also came new materials; shells coated and dripping in black rubber replaced the daintily curling paper to create ominous stalagmites and stalactites. The first piece of this series, Stalagmite, debuted at Pulse Miami in 2015.

=== The totality of time lusters the dusk 2019–present ===
Fensterstock was invited to create a site-specific work for the 2020 Renwick Invitational, Forces of Nature, at the Smithsonian. The work, The totality of time lusters the dusk was informed by the 16th-century illuminated manuscript the Augsburg Book of Miracles. On October 13, 2020, she was a speaker at the virtual preview of Forces of Nature: Renwick Invitational 2020.

== Selected exhibitions ==
=== Solo exhibitions ===
- 2015 Lauren Fensterstock, Leonard Pearlstein Gallery, Drexel University, Philadelphia, PA
- 2015 Stalagmite, PULSE Project at PULSE, NY, NY
- 2014 New Work, Lauren Fensterstock, Independent Art Projects, North Adams, MA
- 2014 Preparatory Drawings, Aucocisco, Portland, ME
- 2013 Lauren Fensterstock, Sienna Gallery, Lenox, MA
- 2013 The Celebration of Formal Effects, Whether Natural or Artificial, John Michael Kohler Arts Center, Sheboygan, WI
- 2011 Incidents of Garden Displacement, Ogunquit Museum of American Art, Ogunquit, ME
- 2010 Mound, Sienna Gallery, Lenox, MA
- 2010 Of Groves, Labyrinths, Dedals, Cabinets, Cradles, Close-Walks, Galleries, Pavilions, Portico's, Lanterns, and Other Relievo's: of Topiary and Hortulan Architecture, Walker Contemporary, Boston, MA
- 2009 New Projects, Washington Art Association, Washington Depot, CT
- 2008 Parterre, Bowdoin College Museum of Art, Brunswick, ME
- 2008 Unearthed, Sienna Gallery, Lenox, MA
- 2007 A Third Nature, Aucocisco Gallery, Portland, ME
- 2006 Lauren Fensterstock, University of Maine Museum of Art, Bangor, ME
- 2005 Dearest, Aucocisco Gallery, Portland, ME
- 2004 Castles in Spain, The Hay Gallery, Portland, ME
- 2003 Precious Heirlooms, Center For Maine Contemporary Art, Rockport, ME
- 2001 Otherwise Portraits, Edward Bannister Gallery, Rhode Island College, Providence, RI

=== Two/three person exhibitions ===
- 2014 Lauren Fensterstock and Susie Ganch, PULSE Miami, with Sienna Patti Contemporary
- 2011 Two Takes: One Space, Lauren Fensterstock and Steve Wiman, Austin Contemporary, Austin, TX
- 2011 Lauren Fensterstock and John Bisbee, Aucocisco Gallery, Portland, ME
- 2008 Lauren Fensterstock, Dylan McManus, Justin Novak, Dorsky Gallery, Long Island City, NY
- 2002 Decisions & Revisions: Lauren Fensterstock & Aaron T Stephan, Hay Gallery, Portland, ME
- 2000 Fairy Tale: Roy Kortik, Rachel Sekelman, Lauren Fensterstock, Elsa Mott Ives Gallery, NY, NY

=== Select group exhibitions ===
- 2015 Directors Cut, Portland Museum of Art, Portland, ME
- 2014 Recurrence, Fridman Gallery, New York, NY
- 2014 Surface, Stephen D. Paine Gallery at Mass Art, Boston, MA
- 2013 Piecework, Portland Museum of Art, Portland, ME
- 2012 Dubh: Dialogues in Black, Oliver Sears Gallery, Dublin, Ireland
- 2012 Maine Biennial, Center For Maine Contemporary Art, Rockport, ME
- 2012 Maine Women Pioneers, University of New England, Portland, ME
- 2011 Dubh: Dialogues in Black, American Irish Historical Society, New York, NY
- 2011 Buds, Blooms, & Berries: Plants in Science, Culture, & Art, Everhart Museum, Scranton, PA
- 2011 Decadence and Disarray, Sienna Gallery, Lenox, MA
- 2011 Field of Vision: Artists Explore Place, Racine Art Museum, Racine, WI
- 2010 Sacred and Profane, Portsmouth Museum of Fine Art, Portsmouth, NH
- 2008 The Thinking Body, Museum of Craft and Design, San Francisco, CA
- 2008 The Thinking Body, Jordan Schnitzer Museum of Art, Eugene, OR
- 2008 New Natural History, Portland Museum of Art, Portland, ME
- 2007 In Situ, Sandra and David Bakalar Gallery, Mass Art, Boston, MA
- 2007 Laced With History, John Michael Kohler Arts Center, Sheboygan, WI
- 2007 Marriage of True Minds, University of New England Art Gallery, Portland, ME
- 2006 Landscapes 2006, Beach Hill Farm, College of the Atlantic, Mount Desert Isle, ME
- 2006 Maine Biennial, Center For Maine Contemporary Art, Rockport, ME
- 2005 Everything But Paper Prayers, Barbara Krakow Gallery, Boston, MA
- 2005 Precious Little, Albany International Airport, Albany, NY
- 2005 Touchstones, Blum Gallery, College of the Atlantic, Bar Harbor, ME
- 2005 Portland Biennial, Portland Museum of Art, Portland, ME
- 2004 Exposing Scarlet, The Mills Gallery, Boston Center For the Arts, Boston, MA
- 2004 Exquisite Corpse, Bowdoin College Museum of Art, Brunswick, ME

== Public collections ==
- Portland Museum of Art
- Bowdoin College Museum of Art
- Fidelity Maine General Medical Center
- Ogunquit Museum of American Art
- Tiffany & Co
- University of Maine Museum of Art

== Recognitions and awards ==
- Named one of Top Nine Artists under 40 in Miami, Artsy, 2014
- Artist Fellowship, Maine Arts Commission, 2010
- Louis Comfort Tiffany Foundation (grant nominee), 2005, 2009
- Good Idea Grant, Maine Arts Commission, 2004, 2006, 2008
- Creative Project Award, Grant Recipient, SUNY New Paltz, New Paltz, NY, 1999
- Graduate Fellowship, SUNY New Paltz, Fall 1999, Spring 1999
- Pearl Scharf Scholarship, The Northern Westchester Council of Jewish Women, 1993
