= Myra Mimlitsch-Gray =

American artist (born 1962)

- Born: July 11, 1962; Camden, New Jersey, U.S.
- Education: BFA- Philadelphia College of Art MFA- Cranbrook Academy
- Website: www.mimlitschgray.com

Myra Mimlitsch-Gray (born July 11, 1962) is an American metalsmith, artist, critic, and educator living and working in Stone Ridge, New York. Mimlitsch-Gray's work has been shown nationally at such venues as the John Michael Kohler Arts Center, Museum of the City of New York, Metropolitan Museum of Art, Cooper-Hewitt Smithsonian Design Museum, and Museum of Arts and Design. Her work has shown internationally at such venues as the Middlesbrough Institute of Modern Art, Stadtisches Museum Gottingen, and the Victoria and Albert Museum, and is held in public and private collections in the U.S., Europe, and Asia.

== Early life and education ==
Mimlitsch-Gray was born in Camden, New Jersey in 1962, the daughter of Paul Joseph Mimlitsch and Myra Elizabeth Buck. She was first introduced to metalsmithing and jewelry in high school when she participated in a summer program at Carnegie Mellon University. Mimlitsch-Gray went on to receive her Bachelor of Fine Arts from the Philadelphia College of Art (now University of the Arts) in 1984 where she studied with Sharon Church and majored in Metals and Jewelry. Afterwards, Mimlitsch-Gray attended Cranbrook Academy of Art where she studied with Gary Griffin, and received her Masters of Fine Art in Metalsmithing in 1986.

== Academic work ==
Mimlitsch-Gray is on the faculty and is the head of the Metal Program at the State University of New York at New Paltz. She has influenced notable students such as Lauren Fensterstock, Anya Kivarkis, and Lola Brooks. She also has taught workshops at Penland School of Crafts, Haystack Mountain School of Crafts, University of the Arts, Rhode Island College, among others.

== Awards and fellowships ==
Mimlitsch-Gray has received awards for her work and contributions to the metalsmithing community, including election to the 2016 College of American Craft Fellows by the American Craft Council, and being named a Master Metalsmith by the Metal Museum.

In 1998, SUNY New Paltz recognized Mimlitsch-Gray's educational impact, awarding her the Chancellor's Award for Excellence in Teaching. In 2018, Mimlitsch-Gray received another Chancellor's Award of Excellence from SUNY New Paltz for Excellence in Scholarship and Creative Studies.

She has received fellowships from public and private institutions. In 1995 she was awarded an Individual Artist Fellowships from the Louis Comfort Tiffany Foundation; in 2012 she received the United States Artists Glasgow Fellowship in Craft and Traditional Arts; and in 1997, 2012, and again in 2015 she received fellowships from the New York Foundation for the Arts.

== Selected series and artwork ==
Over Mimlitsch-Gray's career, overarching themes of objecthood, labor, value, and utility have emerged. Of her own work, she has written:

I produce objects as portraits and social indicators. By implying or impeding function I reinterpret utility as a critical strategy. I create wares that are both present and representational, embodying the specifics while also portraying variant roles and circumstances. Deliberately tentative, this work investigates facture, explores gesture and embodies utilitarian notions.

— Myra Mimlitsch-Gray

=== Bisections, Encasements, 1990–1995 ===
Sugar Bowl and Creamer III (1996) at the Renwick Gallery in Washington, DC in 2022

In her series Bisections, Encasements, Mimlitsch-Gray plays with the history of decorative objects and our modern relationship to them. Rather than make a chalice, candlestick, or other item common to traditional silversmithing or hollowware, Mimlitsch-Gray creates negative impressions of these objects which are split into two equal halves and embedded in wooden or metal block forms inspired by shaker design. Stripped of their functionality, these pieces transcend their objecthood to begin functioning as images signifying the shifting cultural attitude towards these types of traditional objects and traditional forms of making. Art Historian Jenni Sorkin wrote, "The imprint of the object is memorialized as an indexical relationship to its usage, its impression a permanent rendering while simultaneously documenting the form’s disappearance… In Mimlitsch-Gray's Bisections/Encasements, the objects are perfect specimens of a past that has been deconstructed, a mediation on the disappearance of skilled labor, and the illusory quality of the objects it produced." Sugar Bowl and Creamer III from this series is held in the permanent collection of the Renwick Gallery, Smithsonian Institution.

=== Magnification, 1997–2001 ===
Magnification challenges the sentimental ideas of the "hand made" and its signifiers. The series consists of eleven metal serving trays that all feature exaggerated surfaces which render the trays largely dysfunctional. The design of these surfaces replicates a traditional planished (fine-hammered) surface that is common in copperware, but in Magnification these hammer marks are magnified approximately 500 times. Particularly in the 19th century, rough hand-hammered textures were often purposely left on objects to signify that they were hand-made and imply a greater value than their machine-made counterparts. Mimlitsch-Gray plays with this history, and the exaggerated hammer marks in Magnification act as a fetishized signifier of labor and its perceived virtue. Handwrought Brass Tray from this series is held in the permanent collection of the Mint Museum of Craft & Design, Pitcher is held in the permanent collection of the Racine Art Museum, and Handwrought Copper Tray is held in the permanent collection of the Cranbrook Art Museum.

=== Kohler Skillets and Pone Pans, 2007 ===
Made during her residency at the John Michael Kohler Arts Center in 2007, Mimlitsch-Gray’s series Kohler Skillets and Pone Pans playfully explores the familiarity of the cast-iron skillet and juxtaposes it with themes of globalization, genetic modification, and mid-western food culture. Kohler Skillets and Pone Pans consists of a series of cast-iron pans (with the exception of one that is chromed brass) that are elongated, bent, melted, or house molds for food that would never fit. Though a master metalsmith, most of Mimlitsch-Gray's previous experience had been with small metals like silver, copper, and brass. Working with cast iron during her Kohler residency was outside her comfort zone and was "...just the disruption she needed. 'I had really run aground,' she says; her mastery of hollowware had become a crutch. 'I really needed to find a new way of working, to put myself in the position of a novice.' " Freestanding Skillet from this series is held in the permanent collection of Kohler Company, and Silver Anniversary is held in the permanent collection of the John Michael Kohler Arts Center.

=== Melting Silver, 2002–2008 ===
In her series Melting Silver, silver objects appear to be caught mid-transformation: highly decorated traditional objects drip and melt into reflective silver puddles. In part, this transformation is anthropomorphic; Mimlitsch-Gray describes them as "contingent, reflecting the anxiety of service", but these objects also highlight the very nature of the material itself as one that is easily recyclable through melting and re-rendering. Candelabrum: Seven Fragments from this series is held in the permanent collection of Cranbrook Art Museum, Melting Candelabrum is held in the permanent collection of Rotasa Trust Collection, Melting Teapot is held in the permanent collection of the Museum of Arts and Design, Melting Sticks is held in the permanent collection of the National Museums of Scotland, and RCA Study Piece is held in the permanent collection of the Victoria and Albert Museum.

=== Something For the Table, 2009–2013 ===
Mimlitsch-Gray’s series Something For the Table provides "tentative" possibilities of what a utilitarian object could be if stripped of historical reference in form and decoration. Jenni Sorkin describes: “Deftly avoiding traditional forms, Mimlitsch-Gray embraces formless objects without prescriptive usages… By and large, the works in this series stage the sensuality of fullness: they read as almost pillowy, a perfect trompe l'oeil in which the illusion of lightness is offset by metalwork’s material thud." Split Slab, 2012, from this series was acquired by the Museum of Fine Arts Houston in 2017. Cindi Strauss, Curator of Modern and Contemporary Decorative Arts and Design and Anna Walker, the Windgate Foundation Curatorial Fellow for Contemporary Craft at The Museum of Fine Arts Houston writes, "We are pleased to acquire Myra Mimlitsch-Gray's Split Slab.... In her reimagining of a serving form, Mimlitsch-Gray upends traditional forms in addition to highlighting silver's fluid properties with exceptional craftsmanship."

=== Studies in Enamelware, 2014-Present ===
Mimlitsch-Gray's most recent series Studies in Enamelware explores vitreous and porcelain enamel on steel forms. This industrial form of enameling first caught Mimlitsch-Gray's interest during her residency at the John Michael Kohler Arts Center, but due to the short nature of the Kohler residency (three months long) it wasn't possible to explore while there. In Studies in Enamelware Mimlitsch-Gray references and abstracts traditional enamelware forms, like the quintessential rolled lip, to explore themes of utilitarian value. She explains, "…it’s sort of like a forced commonality that I’m interested in bringing to the work. So we see that I'm not that motivated by the preciousness conversation right now."

== Selected exhibitions ==
=== Solo exhibitions ===
- 2017 Whatnot, Gallery LOD, Stockholm, Sweden
- 2017 Studies in Enamelware, Sienna Patti Contemporary, Collective Design Fair, New York, New York
- 2016 In/Animate: Recent Work by Myra Mimlitsch-Gray, Sara Bedrick Gallery, Samuel Dorsky Museum of Art, SUNY New Paltz
- 2014 Master Metalsmith: Myra Mimlitsch-Gray, National Ornamental Metal Museum, Memphis, Tennessee
- 2013 Something for the Table, Sienna Gallery, Lenox, Massachusetts
- 2009 anti/icono/clastic, Wexler Gallery, Philadelphia, Pennsylvania
- 2007 Force Times Distance, Sienna Gallery, Lenox, Massachusetts
- 2005 Drifting, John Michael Kohler Art Center, Sheboygan, Wisconsin
- 2004 Interpreting Utility, Gallery 81, New Haven, Connecticut
- 2003 Conflation, Sybaris Gallery, Royal Oak, Michigan
- 2000 Myra Mimlitsch Gray: Studies in Chain Mail, Susan Cummins Gallery, Mill Valley, California
- 1998 Magnification: 500x, Sybaris Gallery, Royal Oak, Michigan
- 1994 Myra Mimlitsch Gray: Objects and Sculpture, Sybaris Gallery, Royal Oak, Michigan
- 1992 Myra Mimlitsch Gray: Metalwork, Moreau Gallery, St. Mary’s College, Notre Dame, Indiana

=== Group exhibitions ===
- 2018 Then and Now, Museum of The City of New York, New York City, New York
- 2018 Raw Design, Curated by Glenn Adamson, Museum of Craft and Design, San Francisco, California
- 2006 Critical Mass: Metalsmithing at Cranbrook under Gary Griffin, Cranbrook Art Museum, Network Gallery, Bloomfield Hills, Michigan
- 2005 120 Temptations: International, Invitational Exhibition, Cheongju International Craft Biennale, Republic of Korea
- 2005 Crafts Now – 21 Artists Each from America, Europe and Asia, World Craft Forum, Kanazawa, Japan
- 2005 Jewelry Beyond Jewelry, Hunterdon Museum of Art, Clinton, New Jersey
- 2002 Innovative Tools for Personal Use, Center for Visual Arts, Denver, Colorado
- 2001 21st Century Metalsmiths, Newtown Art Center, Newtown, Massachusetts
- 2001 A View by Two: International Contemporary Jewelry, Museum of Art, Rhode Island School of Design, Providence, Rhode Island
- 2000 Women Designers in the USA, 1900 – 2000; Diversity and Difference, Bard Graduate Center for Studies in the Decorative Arts, Design and Culture, New York, New York
- 2000 The Renwick Invitational, Renwick Gallery, National Museum of American Art, Smithsonian Institution, Washington, DC
- 2000 Defining Craft, American Craft Museum, New York, New York
- 1999 Handfraught – Myra Mimlitsch-Gray and Anne Newdigate Glyde Hall, Banff Centre for the Arts, Alberta, Canada
- 1999 Contemporary Crafts of New York State, New York State Museum, Albany, New York
- 1999 Craft Forms, Wayne Art Center, Wayne, Pennsylvania
- 1998 Twelfth Silver Triennial, Deutsche Goldschmiedeshaus, Hanau, Städtisches Museum, Gottingen, Germany
- 1997 Do Not Touch: Objects by Mary Douglas, Myra Mimlitsch Gray and Mike Hill, City Gallery at Chastain, Atlanta, Georgia
- 1997 Metal Speaks the Unexpected, San Francisco Craft and Folk Art Museum, California
- 1997 Metals Centennial, Society of Arts and Crafts, Boston, Massachusetts
- 1996 Signals: Late Twentieth-Century American Jewelry, Cranbrook Art Museum, Bloomfield Hills, Michigan
- 1996 New Jewelry from USA, Scottish Gallery, Edinburgh, Scotland. Hipotesi Gallery, Barcelona, Spain. Lesley Craze Gallery, London, England. Artbox, Waregem, Belgium. Ademloos Gallery, The Hague, Netherlands
- 1995 Schmuckszene '95, Sonderschau der 47, Internationalen Handwerksmesse, Munich, Germany
- 1994 Analogue Reality: Crafts and the Haptic Haviland, Strickland Gallery, University of the Arts, Philadelphia, Pennsylvania
- 1994 National Metals Invitational, University of Akron Art Gallery, Akron, Ohio
- 1994 The Lure of the Physical, Greater Lafayette Museum of Art, Lafayette, Indiana
- 1993 Sculptural Concerns: Contemporary American Metal Working, Contemporary Art Center, Cincinnati, Ohio. Fort Wayne Museum of Art, Fort Wayne, Indiana. American Craft Museum, New York, New York. Spencer Museum, University of Kansas, Lawrence, Kansas. Tampa Museum of Art, Tampa, Florida. Knoxville Museum of Art, Knoxville, Tennessee. Grand Rapids Art Museum, Grand Rapids, Michigan. California College of Arts and Crafts, Oakland, California
- 1992 Form and Object: Contemporary Interpretations of Craft Traditions, University of Wyoming Art Museum, Laramie, Wyoming. Dahl Fine Arts Center, Rapid City, South Dakota. Arvada Center for the Arts and Humanities, Arvada, Colorado
- 1992 Borne with a Silver Spoon, National Ornamental Metal Museum, Memphis, Tennessee. Aaron Faber Gallery, New York, New York. Sybaris Gallery, Royal Oak, Michigan. The Hand and the Spirit, Scottsdale, Arizona. Katie Gingrass Gallery, Milwaukee, Wisconsin. New Art Forms Exposition, Chicago, Illinois. Concepts Gallery, Carmel, California. Skidmore College Art Gallery, Saratoga Springs, New York
- 1992 Silver: New Forms and Expressions III, Fortunoff, New York, New York. National Ornamental Metal Museum, Memphis, Tennessee. Union Gallery, Louisiana State University, Baton Rouge, Louisiana. List Art Center, Brown University, Providence, Rhode Island. Walter Anderson Museum of Art, Ocean Springs, Mississippi
- 1991 Copper III, Old Pueblo Museum, Tucson, Arizona
- 1991 The 31st Annual Mid-States Crafts Exhibition, Evansville Museum of Arts and Sciences, Evansville, Indiana
- 1990 Art and Ideology: The Social Function of Craft, Urban Institute for Contemporary Arts, Grand Rapids, Michigan
- 1990 Metals Now, Downey Museum of Art, Downey, California
- 1989 Biennial '89, Delaware Art Museum, Wilmington, Delaware
- B1988 Blood on the Fence: New Metalsmithing, Indianapolis Art League, Indianapolis, Indiana
- 1987 Marcel Duchamp: The Legacy Continues..., Samuel Fleisher Art Memorial, Philadelphia, Pennsylvania

== Selected public collections ==
- Cooper Hewitt, Smithsonian Design Museum, New York, New York
- Cranbrook Art Museum, Bloomfield Hills, Michigan
- Detroit Institute of Arts, Detroit, Michigan
- The Enamel Arts Foundation, Los Angeles, California
- Greater Lafayette Museum of Art, Lafayette, Indiana
- John Michael Kohler Arts Center, Sheboygan, Wisconsin
- Kohler Co., Kohler, Wisconsin
- Metal Museum, Memphis, Tennessee
- Metropolitan Museum of Art, New York, New York
- Mint Museum of Craft and Design, Charlotte, North Carolina
- Mitsubichi Materials Corporation, Sandau, Japan
- Museum of Fine Arts, Boston, Boston, Massachusetts
- Museum of Fine Arts, Houston, Houston, Texas
- Museum of Arts and Design, New York, New York
- National Museums of Scotland, Edinburgh, Scotland
- Philadelphia Museum of Art, Philadelphia, Pennsylvania
- Racine Art Museum, Racine, Wisconsin
- Renwick Gallery, National Museum of American Art, Smithsonian Institution, Washington, DC
- Samuel Dorsky Museum of Art, New Paltz, New York
- University of Akron, Mary Myers School of Art, Akron, Ohio
- Victoria and Albert Museum, London, England
- Yale University Art Gallery, New Haven, Connecticut
