= Lola Brooks =

Lola Brooks may refer to:

- Lola Brooks (artist) (born 1970), American artist
- Lola Brooks (actress) (c. 1923-1985), New Zealand-Australian actress
