= Barbara Seidenath =

Jewellery designer

- Born: 1960 (age 64–65); Bavaria, Germany
- Education: Academy of Fine Arts, Munich
- Known for: jewelry designer, metalsmith, goldsmith, professor
- Spouse: Louis Mueller

Barbara Seidenath (born 1960) is a German-born American jewelry designer, metalsmith, and educator.

== Biography ==
Barbara Seidenath was born in 1960 in Bavaria, near Munich, Germany. Her father worked in forestry and her mother was a school doctor. Seidenath is married to artist and metalsmith Louis Mueller (born 1943).

She studied from 1977 to 1980 at the Staatliche Berufsfachschule für Glas und Schmuck (English: State Vocational School for Jewelry and Glass) in Neugablonz, studying under family friend and jeweler Hermann Jünger. During college, Seidenath worked for jeweler Ulrike Bahrs (born 1944) which influenced her use of color in her work. In 1981, she was an exchange student at State University of New York at New Paltz, studying under Robert Ebendorf and Kurt Matzdorf. From 1984 to 1990, Seidenath attended the Academy of Fine Arts, Munich where she received her MFA degree.

For many years she had co-founded a line of jewelry with Lydia Gastroph (born 1957). Seidenath is known for her enamel work, as well as materials like gold, silver, and precious stones. Since the 1990s, she has taught at Rhode Island School of Design and at the School of the Museum of Fine Arts.

Seidenath's work can be found in public museum collections at the Samuel Dorsky Museum of Art, Los Angeles County Museum of Art, Rhode Island School of Design Museum, Museum of Fine Arts, Boston, as well as at others.
