= Telephone Bill and the Smooth Operators =

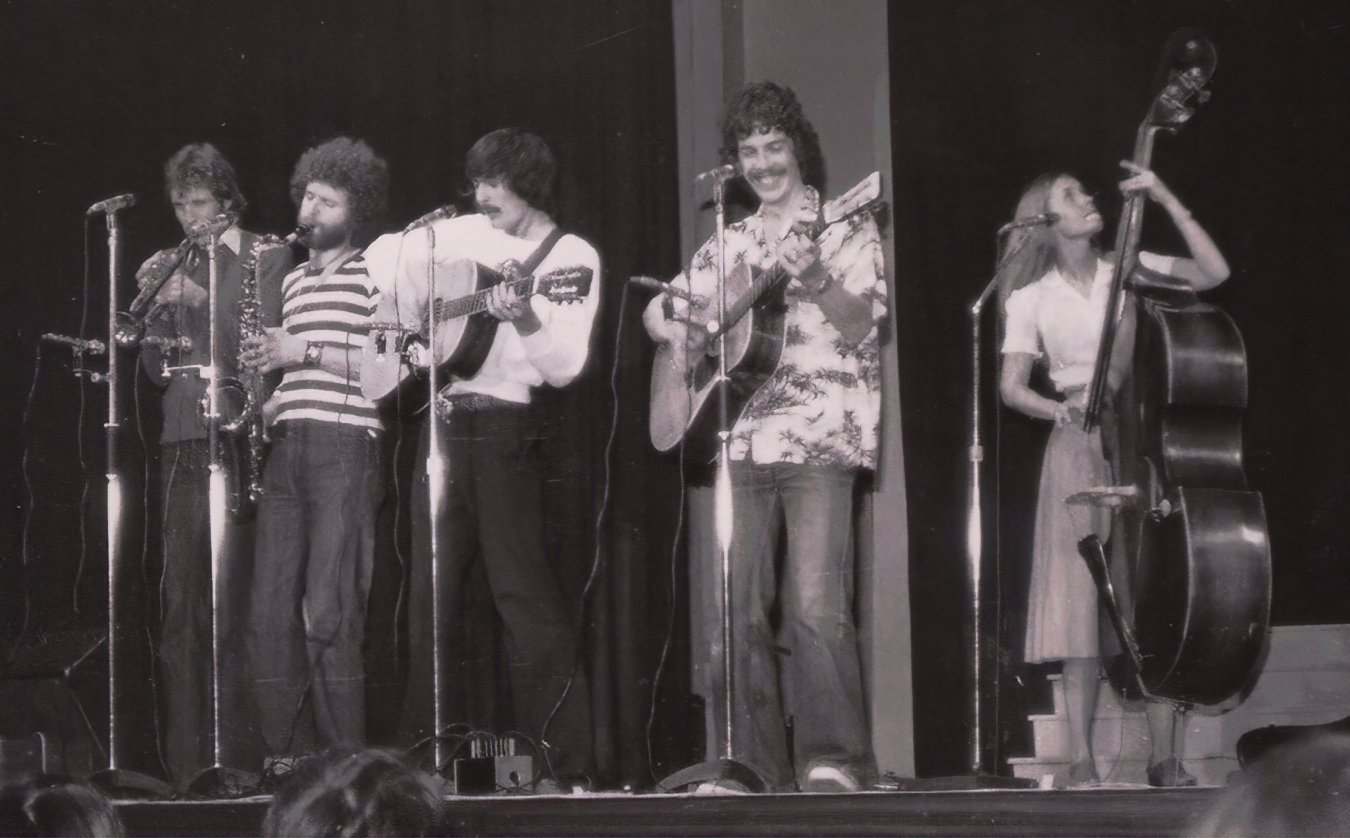
- Telephone Bill and the Smooth Operators at the 1977 Norwich Folk Festival, UK

Background information
- Origin: Cambridge, England
- Genres: Folk; Country; Swing
- Years active: 1975-1981, 2001-present
- Labels: Swamp Records, Smooth Records, Dingle's Records
- Members: Nick Barraclough; Robb Appleton; Chris Cox; Steve Reynolds; Paula Welham
- Past members: Gerry Hale; Anne Baker; Andy Metcalfe; Tony Shepherd; Richard Lee

Telephone Bill and the Smooth Operators is a UK musical group performing an original blend of folk/country/swing music. They formed in Cambridge, UK in the 1970s, split up in the 1980s, and re-formed to play at the 2001 Cambridge Folk Festival and thereafter.

== History ==
Telephone Bill and the Smooth Operators formed in Cambridge, England in around 1975 as an amalgam of musicians from some previous local groups including "Baby Whale" and "Duke, Duke and the Dukes", several of whom (Nick Barraclough, Anne Baker and Gerry Hale) also worked with UK bluegrass musician and recording artist Pete Sayers. The group was/is fronted by Nick Barraclough on guitar, 5-string banjo and vocals and also included virtuoso fiddle/mandolin player Gerry Hale, singers and songwriters Anne Baker and Chris Cox, plus (at different times) Robb Appleton, Andy Metcalfe, Tony Shepherd and Richard Lee. Their music has roots in bluegrass, jazz and swing, plus original numbers with a style reminiscent of the "lazy swing" of Dan Hicks, and has been described as "sort of Americana, swingy, bluesy stuff with bags of harmony and whizzy playing"; their theme song, "Telephone Bill", being a re-write/extension of the Peter Rowan song "Panama Red" (originally written for the band New Riders of the Purple Sage). In their initial incarnation they toured widely, performed on UK television and BBC radio, and recorded 3 albums on the Swamp, Smooth and Dingle's record labels. In 2001 they re-formed to play at that year's Cambridge Folk Festival and meanwhile, also played gigs and released one album as "Nick Barraclough and the Burglars" (alias the "Burglars of Barcelona"). The present line-up comprises original members Nick Barraclough, Robb Appleton, Chris Cox and Steve Reynolds together with new member Paula Welham on sax, flute and vocals.

Barraclough became a BBC country/folk presenter and producer (1982 onwards) based in Cambridge, Manchester and London (see main article: Nick Barraclough), Gerry Hale moved to Australia and continued to work as a musician there (see main article: Gerry Hale) while Anne Baker, originally from Bryn Mawr, Pennsylvania, U.S.A., who had initially trained as an artist, returned to art and moved back to the U.S.A. in 2009, settling in Villanova near her childhood home where she teaches at the Wayne Art Center and has established a successful career as a portrait artist under her married name, Anne Graham.

== Discography ==
=== Albums ===
- Pretty Slick, Huh? Swamp Records WAM 679, 1979 album details
- Lounge Music Smooth Records DIAL 100, 1980 album details
- Included on Various artists: 1979 Cambridge Folk Festival (other artists: The Boys Of The Lough / Maddy Prior / Loudon Wainwright III) (6 tracks, as Disc 1, side 1) BBC Transcription Services – CN 3480/S, 146153-S/ 146154-S, 1980 (Non commercial Transcription Discs, 2x LPs)
- Manhattan Roll Dingle's Records DID 713, 1982 album details
- Final Reminder (compilation) Kissing Spell KSCD926, 2001 album details
- (As Nick Barraclough and the Burglars): Daylight Robbery Gott Discs, 2007 album details
- Pioneering 2013 (details??)
- Live and Long Overdue Smooth Records DIAL 105, ca. 2024 (2 x CDs, previously unreleased live tracks); also single CD version (11 tracks, digital release only, 2024 album details)

=== Singles ===
- Manhattan Roll / You Got To Believe Weekend Records DJS 10785, 1977
- Cruisin' / Pinball Wizard' Weekend Records DJS 10858, 1977
- Wanna See Your Telephone Bill / Pioneering / Hollywood (You Kiss While You're Dancing) / If I Had My Way Weekend Records DJS 10885 (EP), 1978
- Boogie Woogie Piggie Smooth Records Ring 1 (promo), 197?
