= Ornament (magazine) =

Magazine about jewelry and personal adornment

- Founded: 1974 (as The Bead Journal); 1978 (as Ornament)
- Country: USA
- Language: English
- Website: www.ornamentmagazine.org

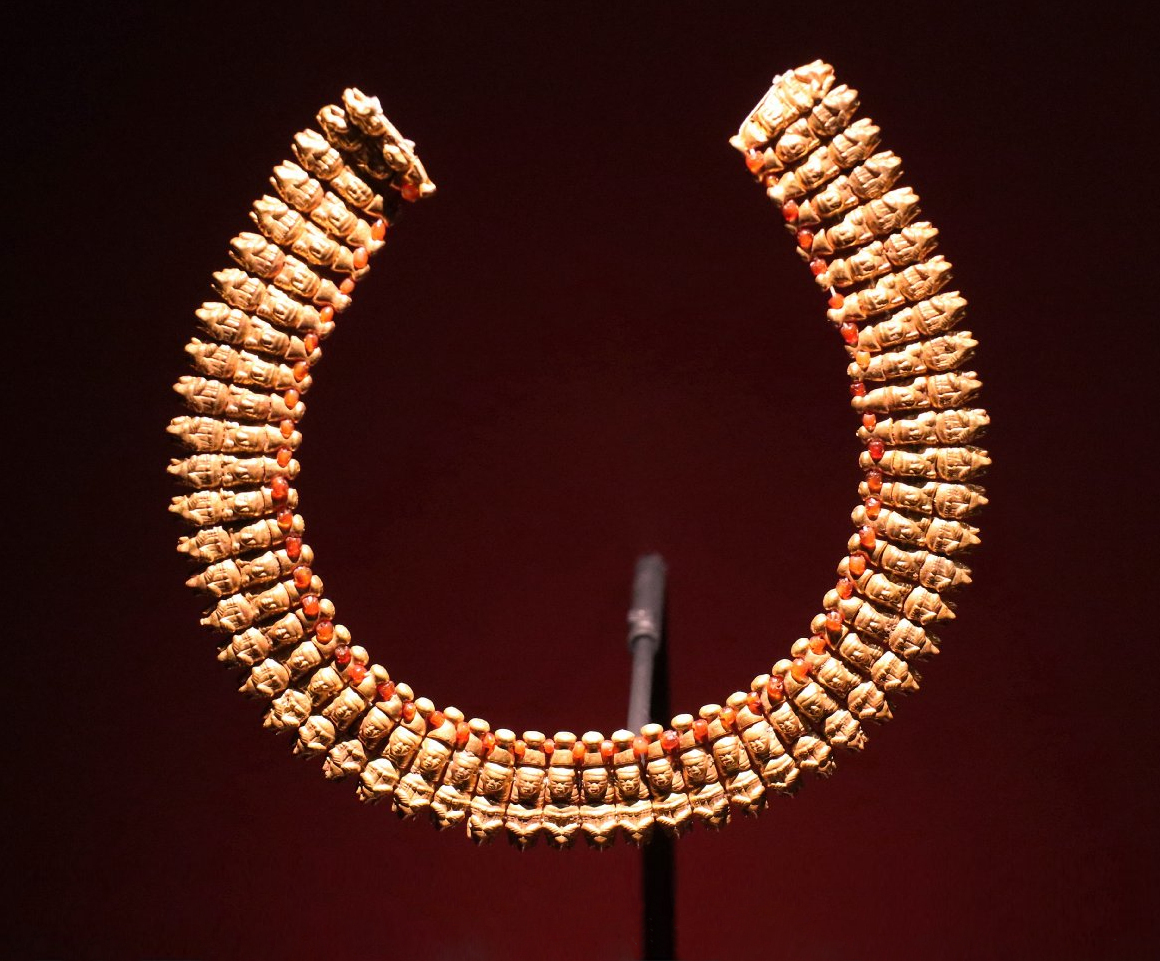
Meroitic period necklace of gold and carnelian beads

External videos
- Ornament Magazine, Preview from the JEWELRY episode, Nov 4, 2021 on PBS
- Carolyn Benesh’s legacy, Bonus video from the JEWELRY episode. PBS broadcast premiere Dec 10, 2021

Ornament is a periodical magazine that documents the history, art and craft of ancient, ethnic and contemporary jewelry and personal adornment. It presents and discusses a wide range of personal adornment and wearable art, including beads, jewelry, and clothing.

The periodical was founded by Carolyn L. E. Benesh and Robert K. Liu in 1974 as The Bead Journal: A Quarterly Publication of Ancient and Ethnic Jewelry. Its focus was expanded and it was retitled Ornament : A Quarterly of Jewelry and Personal Adornment in 1978. Their son Patrick R. Benesh-Liu began to work full-time for the magazine in 2005, and is now a co-editor.

Robert Liu is also the in-house photographer for Ornament. His cover images have been described as "stunningly beautiful".

Ornament magazine sponsors and selects the winner for the Ornament Award for Excellence in Art to Wear, at the Philadelphia Museum of Art Craft Show.

== The Founders ==
Robert K. Liu studied ethnology and ichthyology and is a jeweler and photographer. He has written and lectured extensively on history, jewelry, and photography. He is the author of the books Collectible Beads: A Universal Aesthetic (1995) The Photography of Personal Adornment (2014) and Naval Ship Models of World War II (2021).

Carolyn L. E. Benesh was a respected scholar, lecturer, and writer, and a collector of contemporary jewelry. She was a frequent juror for Philadelphia Museum of Art Craft Show and the Smithsonian Craft Show and a president and board member of PBS's series Craft in America. Benesh died on September 30, 2020. An exhibition spotlighting one hundred items from her collection, The Process of Becoming: The Jewelry Collection of Carolyn L.E. Benesh, appeared at the Wayne Art Center in December 2021. It was curated by Carol Sauvion and Emily Zaiden.
