= Lola Brooks (artist) =

American artist

- Education: BFA in Metals
- Alma mater: SUNY New Paltz
- Known for: Jewelry, Metalworking, Fine Arts, Fashion, and Design

Lola Brooks is an artist, metalsmith, and educator who specializes in jewelry. Brooks' works have been shown at places such as the National Ornamental Metal Museum, The Society of Arts and Crafts, Cleveland Museum of Natural History, the Museum of Craft and Folk Art, and was included in the Talente exhibition in 1996. She has created works that are part of the permanent collection of the Museum of Art and Design, Yale Art Gallery, and the Metropolitan Museum of Art.

Brooks grew up in suburban Connecticut. She spent two decades in New York city before relocating to Georgia in 2012.

== Education ==
Brooks received her Bachelor's degree in Fine Arts from SUNY New Paltz where she studied with Jamie Bennett and Myra Mimlitsch-Gray.

== Career ==
Brooks served as visiting faculty at Cranbrook Academy of Art from 2015–2016 in Metalsmithing. She was previously the Lamar Dodd Professorial Chair from 2012-2013 at the University of Georgia, and has also taught at the Rhode Island School of Design, the University of the Arts, and SUNY New Paltz. She has also taught the 92nd St Y in New York City, Haystack Mountain School of Crafts, and Penland School of Crafts.

In April 2021, she held a solo exhibition, story of the eye: a subculture of ornamental oddities, at Sienna Patti Contemporary. Brooks typically hosts a solo exhibition with Sienna Patti Contemporary every two years. Her solo-exhibitions also include: “plunder” 2002, “new works” 2004, “caricature” 2006, “confection” 2008, “sentimental foolery” 2009, and “charted territories” 2012.

== Artwork ==
Brooks' studio jewelry combines Victorian sentimental jewelry, Berlin Iron Jewelry, twentieth-century costume jewelry, hip hop "bling" culture, tattoos, American road trip culture, and cultural signifiers of love and femininity.

Ashley Callahan for Ornament Magazine describes her artwork:

Brooks' jewelry is luxurious excess. The scale is often large, though always unquestionably wearable. Brooches, necklaces, rings, and bracelets feature multitudes of glittering stones, hordes of antique ivory roses or tarnished steel bows, and mounds of faceted steel balls. She mixes high and low, setting diamonds next to quartz, and upends expected uses of materials, soldering steel with gold. She is devoted to the traditions of metalsmithing and relishes the technical challenges that each new object presents.

Brooks' adherence to the format of jewelry is important in her studio practice. She explains her interest in the format of jewelry in an interview for the American Craft Council: "I believe in the power of jewelry's intimate scale and symbiotic reliance on the body, and the fact that its beauty and materiality have always been poisoned by a shameless celebration of wealth, excess, and debaucheries. I love that it becomes inextricably tied into how we cultivate identity."

Along with her high-end art jewelry, Brooks also maintains a more traditional jewelry line.

== Public collections ==
- Yale Art Gallery, New Haven, CT
- The Samuel Dorsky Museum, New Paltz, NY
- The Museum of Fine Arts Boston
- The Racine Museum of Art, Racine, Wisconsin
- The Museum of Art and Design
- Metropolitan Museum of Art in New York City

== Selected grants, recognition, and residencies ==
- Sienna Gallery Emerging Artist Award in 2002
- 2012-2013 Lamar Dodd Professional Chair, Lamar Dodd School of Art, University of Georgia
- 2012 RISD Part-Time Faculty Association Development Fund Grant, Rhode Island School of Design Part-time Faculty Association
- 2002 Emerging Artist Award, Sienna Gallery, Lenox, Massachusetts
