= Woodward Gallery =

Art gallery in Manhattan, New York

- Established: April 1994
- Location: Lower East Side, Manhattan, New York City, New York, United States
- Coordinates: 40°43′8.19″N 73°59′30.17″W
- Type: Art gallery
- Website: woodwardgallery.net

The Woodward Gallery is a contemporary fine art gallery that opened in April 1994 under the incorporation G.O.L.A, Inc. (Gallery of Living Artists). The inaugural exhibition was held in Times Square at the Roundabout Theatre Company. It is owned by John Woodward and Kristine Woodward.

== History ==
The gallery space started in New York City at 419 Lafayette Street and moved to SoHo at 476 Broome Street. Woodward Gallery moved to the private building at 133 Eldridge Street in May 2007 on the Lower East Side of New York City. Woodward Gallery relocated to their current ground floor space ten years later at 132A Eldridge Street between Broome and Delancey.

Woodward Gallery features emerging and established artists and shows Surrealism, abstract expressionism, pop art, color field painting, minimalism, conceptual art, neo-expressionism, and street art among other movements. Margaret Morrison, for example, has been exhibiting her work at the gallery since 1994 when she was discovered by John Woodward.

The Woodward Project Space on Eldridge Street has supported urban art murals from 2008 to 2016. The Gallery’s public exhibition space featured up to 6 shows a year for 23 years.

Woodward Gallery and CARSI labs, Hunter College, CUNY with the cooperation of the City of New York, developed a scientific art exhibition of 9/11 that traveled the country since 2002. A decade later Woodward Gallery brought the show back to New York City before donating it to the National September 11 Memorial & Museum.

Woodward Gallery has been an advocate for art in New York Public Schools with charitable donations and class tours.

== Richard Hambleton ==
Richard Hambleton, a Canadian painter who had moved to New York City in the mid 1970s would go on to achieve global recognition for his conceptual artwork after suffering through years of addiction and obscurity. Thanks to the perseverance by the Director of Woodward Gallery, John Woodward, Richard Hambleton’s artwork is now highly sought after. John had been following Richard Hambleton’s Shadowman paintings on the streets of NYC since the 1980s. A destitute artist, Hambleton was championed by John and Kristine Woodward, who provided him with a range of support from medical assistance, shelter and studio space, all the while stirring renewed interest in this overlooked, but hugely talented artist.

Over the course of three decades, John Woodward was able to develop, vet and establish Richard Hambleton’s resume, exhibition history and create an archive of Artwork by the Artist that continues to be updated today. Woodward Gallery published a limited print edition in 2005, The Gang of Four, and in 2006 another series, titled The Cat Stack directly with the Artist. Woodward Gallery’s Richard Hambleton: The Beautiful Paintings 2007 Exhibition at their 133 Eldridge Street, New York City space was the artist’s first solo exhibition in a decade. This exhibition was the flashpoint which resurrected the Artist’s career.

Over the years the Woodward’s developed a very close relationship with the artist. As his health continued to deteriorate, they embraced a larger role in his care. Filmed over the span of approximately eight years, John Woodward was the Art Consultant and a narrator on the documentary film, Shadowman by Oren Jacoby. He is widely considered the foremost authority on Richard Hambleton’s art.
