= Lamar Dodd School of Art =

Art school at the University of Georgia

Coordinates: 33.9404°N 83.3693°W

The Lamar Dodd School of Art is the art school of the Franklin College of Arts and Sciences at the University of Georgia (UGA) in Athens, Georgia, United States.

== History ==
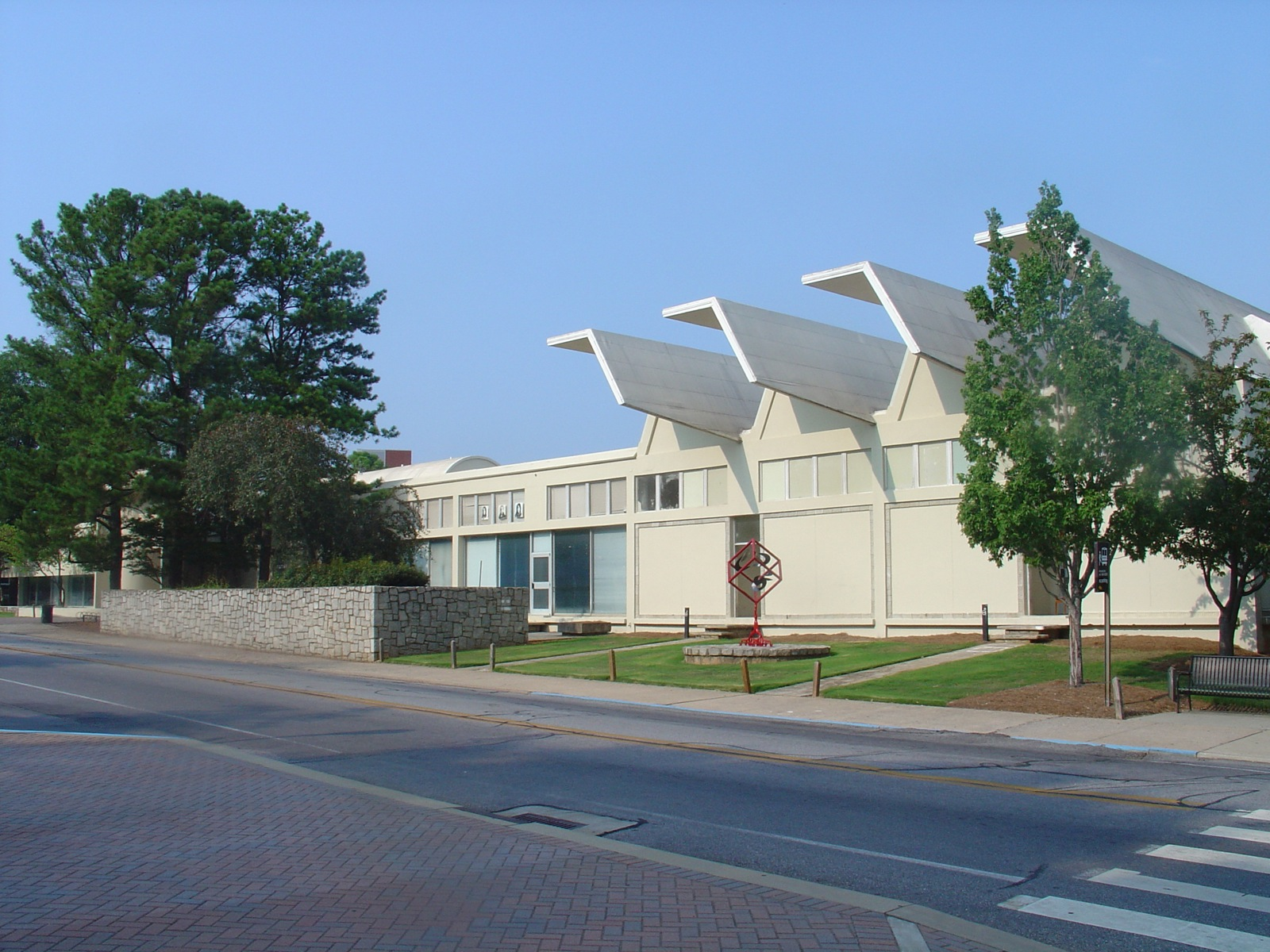
The home of the UGA art school from 1963 to 2008

In 1927, the University of Georgia’s board of trustees voted to establish formally a chair of fine and applied arts in the college of agriculture. Prior to the formal establishment of the art department, opportunities to study craft had existed at the Normal School and the College of Agriculture. In his announcement of the new department of fine and applied arts, the president of the College of Agriculture stated that the program would include instruction “in drawing, painting, clay work, designing and art work.”

Mildred Pierce Ledford (1895–1975) of Tennessee arrived in the fall of 1927 to head the new department. Ledford had received her bachelor of science degree in education from the University of Oklahoma and a diploma in fine and applied arts from Pratt Institute in New York. Ledford—whose college education set her apart from the majority of female art teachers on college campuses in the United States at the time—taught a variety of courses, including ones that offered instruction in batik, weaving, metalwork, basketry, block printing fabrics, and other areas of applied design, as well as art history and appreciation. Known as applied art in the College of Agriculture, it was a part of the department of Home Economics.

In 1937, the University hired Lamar Dodd to the position of resident artist with a title of associate professor. The next year he was made the department head, and he earned a full professorship in 1939. With an enrollment of fifty art majors in 1937, Dodd had grown that number to 225 by 1948.

Dodd brought in John Held Jr. for the 1940-1941 school year and Jean Charlot for the 1941-1942 school year as artists in residence. Charlot adorned the Fine Arts Building with a fresco depicting music, drama and the visual arts.

Dodd also began an annual art auction in 1940 of the works of student and outside artists to raise money to promote the arts. He built the permanent collection of the Art Museum and created an annual Georgia Student Art Exhibition to display the works of local high school and college students. The scope of the art department grew from public school and commercial art to all facets of artwork.

The year 1940 also marked the opening of the Fine Arts building with the entire left wing being occupied by the Art Department. The central portion of the building contained a 2000-seat auditorium, and the music department occupied the right wing.

Dodd headed the art school until he retired in 1972, and the school was named in his honor in 1996.

== Faculty and visiting artists ==
The art school has been home to a number of noted faculty including Jack Davis, Art Rosenbaum, and Margaret Morrison.

=== Lamar Dodd professorial chair ===
Distinguished international artists selected are invited for one-year fellowships to take part in the academic and artistic communities within the school. Elaine De Kooning, Mel Chin, Michael Lucero, David Sandlin, Kendall Buster, Lola Brooks, Kota Ezawa, Zoe Strauss, and Paul Pfeiffer, Lauren Fensterstock, and Trevor Paglen have all served in this chair.

== Current facilities ==
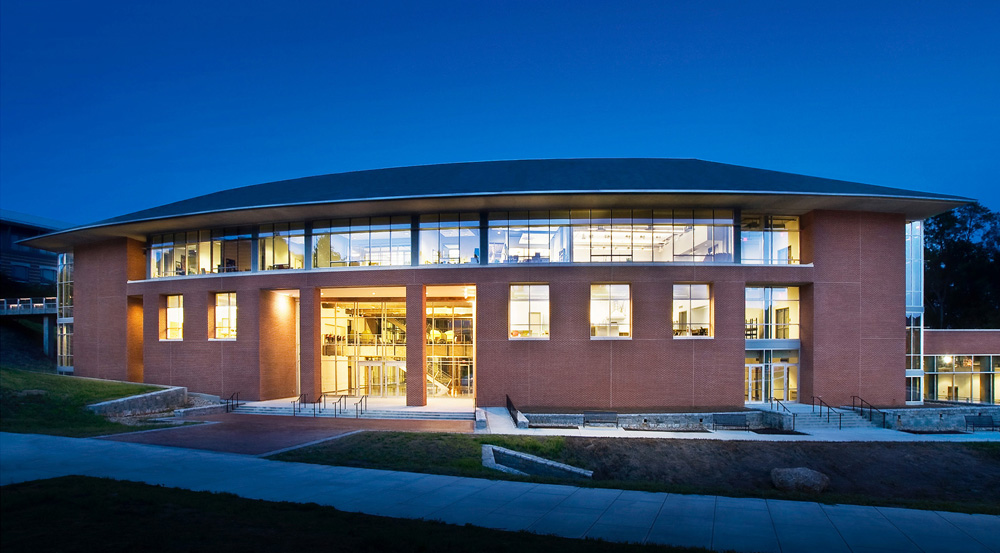
Facade of Lamar Dodd School of Art

As of 2006, the art school had 1000 undergraduate and 100 graduate students and was housed in seven separate locations on the UGA campus; however, in 2008, the school of art moved into a new facility built on east campus. The $39 million building has 171,000 square feet (15,900 m^{2}) of space.

Additionally, a stand-alone facility devoted to ceramics was completed in 2011 and is located adjacent to the main building on east campus. On north campus, the Thomas Street Art Complex houses both sculpture and jewelry & metalwork, and the Broad Street Studios house the Interior Design program.

== Lamar Dodd School of Art Galleries ==
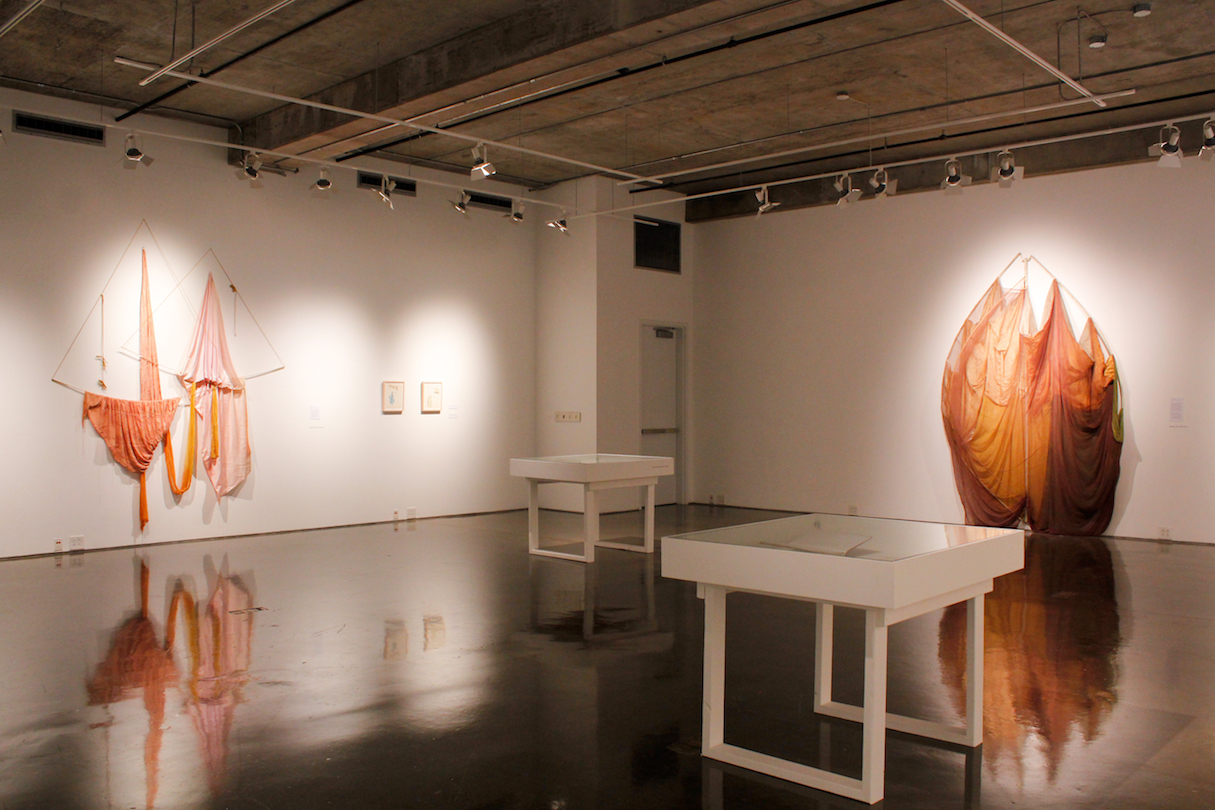
Installation view of one of the Dodd Galleries

The Lamar Dodd School of Art Galleries (or Dodd Galleries) are dedicated to understanding and promoting contemporary art as a tool and catalyst for education. The Galleries consist of five exhibition spaces that act as laboratories and testing grounds for innovation located among our classrooms and studios. Committed to the idea of art-as-research, the galleries host established and emerging artists, designers, critics, and curators of national and international stature along with interdisciplinary programming designed to question, educate and inspire. The mission of the Galleries is to challenge contemporary perceptions of art-making and promote the idea that art is essential to the production of knowledge. The Galleries produces rotating exhibitions and events that examine the cultural and social contexts around us, instigates cross-disciplinary dialogues and essential art experiences, and provides a framework for intellectual and creative inquiry.

== See also ==
- Reed, Thomas Walter (c. 1949). "History of the University of Georgia". University of Georgia. pp. 3025–3029.
