= Margaret Morrison =

American fine art painter and professor (born 1960)

- Born: 1960 (age 65–66); Utah, U.S.
- Education: University of Utah
- Known for: Paintings

Margaret Morrison (born January 1960) is an American fine art painter and professor. Morrison is a tenured professor of drawing and painting at Lamar Dodd School of Art, the University of Georgia (UGA).

== Early life ==
Morrison was born in Castlepark, Utah in 1960, the youngest of six daughters. In her formative years, she lived in the Philippines and traveled extensively through the Middle East, Asia, and Europe.

Morrison received a B.F.A. in 1981 and a M.F.A. degree in Drawing and Painting in 1986 from the University of Utah.

== Career ==
After developing her style and exhibiting at an artist run gallery in Soho in New York City, she was contacted by John Woodward from Woodward Gallery in 1994. She continues to show her work through the Woodward Gallery.

In her solo exhibition, Theory of Flight and Painting (2000) at Woodward, Morrison's surreal figures expressed flight on several levels. The predominant figure in the paintings is a man in a white lab coat. Morrison's "professor" served as a visual mentor who represented flight as a metaphor for life. In her 2003 exhibition, Centricity, Morrison's characters gained life experience. They explored their unique natures while contemplating the paths before them. The white lab coat became a symbol of self-awareness. Morrison portrayed subjects at different stages of awakening. Morrison incorporated early encounters with art history in her work Patron Saints and Rituals (2005). Each of these paintings invited the viewer into a world of ancient rituals, religious symbolism and contemporary concerns.

Morrison was diagnosed with breast cancer in 2008 and became a breast cancer survivor. A notable shift in her subject matter and color palette flowed from this experience. Her 2009 solo exhibition, Larger Than Life, became a visual celebration of life. Her dark, somber palette was replaced with jewel like colors, sparkling with high intensity. Morrison turned to imagery that, for her, became therapy. Sweet treats and comfort food on a massive scale dominated her paintings. Smithsonian Magazine commented, "The artist paints, well, larger-than-life canvases of gummy centipedes, chocolate bonbons and other sugary delights. I think I got a cavity just looking at it." In 2012 Morrison relived her childhood world of imagination with giant robots, enormous pull toys, life size dolls, and Fisher Price people for the Child's Play Exhibition.

Morrison's work was featured at the Four Seasons Restaurant in New York City, at the Flinn Gallery/Greenwich Library in Connecticut, Yellowstone Art Museum (YAM) in Montana, and as part of the American Embassy in Israel for the U.S. Department of State, Art in Embassies Program.

== Personal life ==
Margaret married Richard Morrison, a UGA chemistry professor, in 1980 and they have four children. Morrison is a member of the Church of Jesus Christ of Latter-day Saints.
