= Lisa Gralnick =

American contemporary metalsmith, studio jeweler and academic (born 1956)

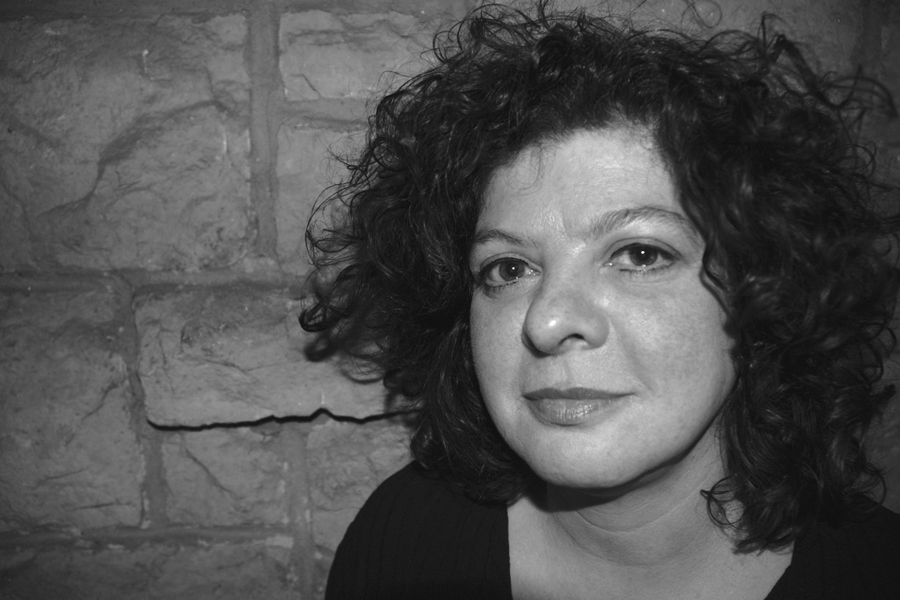
- Lisa Gralnick
- Born: September 27, 1956 (age 69); New York
- Occupations: Contemporary metalsmith, studio jeweler and academic

Lisa Gralnick (born 1956) is an American contemporary metalsmith, studio jeweler and academic. She works in the field of craft and art jewelry. Gralnick says: "I have chosen to make jewelry, which is traditionally considered 'craft', and I do enjoy the processes and techniques that allow me to execute my work without technical faults. But 'craft' is only a means to an end for me, as it is for many artists. My desire to push the limits of jewelry and expand on them, to comment on its traditions and associations, is more the concern of any artist."

== Education ==
Gralnick was born in New York on September 27, 1956. She received a BFA from Kent State University, Kent, Ohio in 1977 and an MFA degree in Metalsmithing from SUNY New Paltz in 1980 under Professors Kurt Matzdorf and Robert Ebendorf. After completing her graduate degree, she taught at Kent State University and Nova Scotia College of Art and Design before settling in New York City in 1982 to pursue her career as an artist. She was the Head of the Jewelry and Metals program at Parsons School of Design from 1991-2001. She moved to Madison, Wisconsin in 2001 and is Professor of Art at the University of Wisconsin-Madison since 2007.

== Career ==
Her breakthrough came with her Black Acrylic collection (1986-1989). Gralnick began making brooches from black acrylic sheet, using geometric forms described as recalling "machines and architecture" but that "also read as pure abstraction". Her black acrylic brooches maintained the connection to jewelry by contrasting matt and polished surfaces and the addition of precious materials like gold. It originated from an encounter with "a house that had been sheathed in black rubber by its eccentric owner. The industrial rubber, entirely inappropriate for a residence, rendered the house rather mysterious." She was also inspired by record that shattered in her apartment. "Gralnick glued the broken vinyl pieces of the record into a small houselike structure that sat on her bench for about a year before she began her investigations into acrylic, which eventually led to this breakthrough series." Her work was not only a statement on wealth and privilege, but a reaction to American studio jewelry of the time. Gralnick's turn to black fits within a larger aesthetic shift in the jewelry and fine art world in the 1980s and 1990s, where dark themes such as death, trauma and postindustrial decay were common as artists grappled with the end of the Cold War, the spread of AIDs, a worldwide economic recession, and the fin de siècle cultural fears of the coming new millennium. The collection garnered attention for its bold and surreal quality at the time, and in 2002 the American Craft Museum included some of Gralnick's "black work" in an exhibition and catalog of jewelry from the 1980s called "Zero Karat". This collection emphasized the desire of jewelers of the 1980s to move away from the traditional use of gold and stones to make jewelry.

In the 1990s, Gralnick's jewelry changed dramatically with her Mechanical Work (1989-1992) and Reliquaries series (1992-196). She began to use metal, such as silver and gold, and her jewelry became more machine-like, with some pieces incorporating moving parts such as gears, levers, pulleys and weights. The Anti-Gravity Neckpieces (1992) are an outcome of Gralnick's interest in theoretical physics and the Industrial Revolution. Inspired by a model of the expanding universe made by cosmologist Alan Lightman at a Princeton University summer class, Gralnick's neckpieces bring together cosmology and machine functionality, an exploration of "perfect movement", with weights that move up and down, or cords that wind up inside the machine-like parts. The Tragedy of Great Love (1994), a locket necklace now in the collection of the MFA Boston, is a square, hinged box filled with a gold wedding ring and vials of salt and sugar on a silver chain with a single gold link. The elements represent eternal love, the sweet and bitter aspects of love and preciousness and rarity of great love, and the piece "both partakes of and extends the forms and meanings of conventional jewelry".

Gralnick's "The Gold Standard" (2007) is an exhibition in three parts and represents 8 years of work. She states:

In my work, I explore the relationship between gold's history as an artistic medium and the modern material world for which it serves as collateral

In "Part I: Commodification and Sensible Economy," Gralnick cast everyday items and objects in 18k gold and plaster. The amount of gold used on each piece represents the gold value of the depicted object. In "Part II: Phenomenology and Substantialism" Gralnick recorded the objects used before melting them down by casting them in plaster. In "Part III: Transubstantiation and the Historicized Object," she employed the recycled gold to create a collection of "historical" objects with invented histories. The exhibition has been on view in different locations like the Houston Center for Contemporary Craft where it was noted as exploring our complicated relationship with precious metal.

== Selected exhibitions ==
Lisa Gralnick's jewelry has appeared in numerous museum and gallery exhibitions from 1980s to the present. Some of the most significant were

- The Art of Gold, Crocker Art Museum, Sacramento, CA (2003),
- Jewelry from Europe and USA, Tacoma Art Museum, Tacoma, WA (2005),
- RAM Tales :Women Jewelers, Racine Art Museum (2006),
- Metalsmiths and Mentors, at the Chazen museum, University of Wisconsin-Madison (2006),
- Jewelry by Artists, Museum of Fine Arts, Boston (2007), and Ornament as Art: The Helen Williams Drutt Collection, Museum of Fine Arts, Houston (2007).
- Lisa Gralnick: The Gold Standard, Bellevue Arts Museum, Bellevue, WA (2010)

Her work can be found in numerous public collections including the Museum of Arts and Design in New York, the Museum of Fine Arts, Boston, Houston, the Renwick Gallery at the Smithsonian American Art Museum in Washington DC and the Stedelijk Museum in Amsterdam.

== Awards and honors ==
During her career Gralnick received numerous grants including two from the National Endowment for the Arts (1988 and 1992), four from the New York Foundation for the Art Fellowships (1987, 1991, 1995, and 1998), an Eli Lilly Foundation Grant to fund an exhibition at Ball State University (2004), and a grant from the Louis Comfort Tiffany Foundation in 1993. She also participated in 2 interviews. One was with the Columbia University Archives of American Art, Avery Art and Architecture Library, New York in 1994, and the other was with the Smithsonian Archives of American Art in 2008.

== Controversies ==
In 2023 Gralnick was cited with disorderly conduct for exposing her breasts to a student in a disagreement about the student's attire.
