= Richard Hambleton =

Canadian graffiti artist (1952–2017)

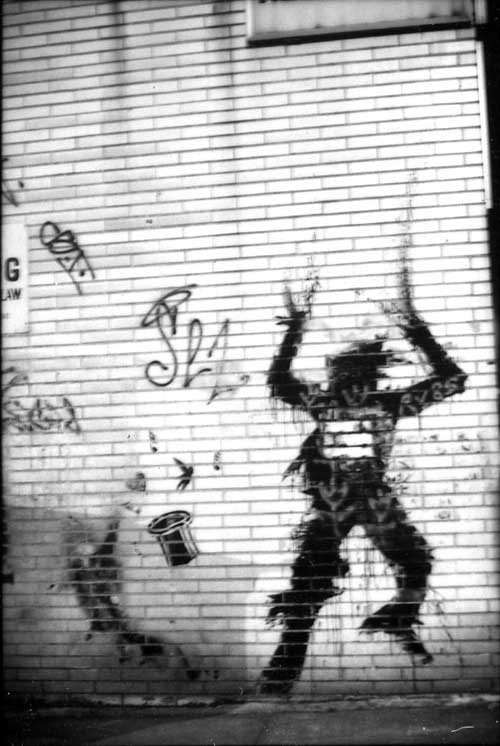
- Richard Hambleton's "Shadowman" painting, Lower Manhattan, New York, 1982
- Born: June 23, 1952; Vancouver, British Columbia, Canada
- Died: October 29, 2017 (aged 65); New York City, United States
- Known for: Painter, graffiti artist

Richard Art Hambleton (June 23, 1952 – October 29, 2017) was a Canadian artist known for his work as a street artist. He was a surviving member of a group that emerged from the New York City art scene during the booming art market of the 1980s which also included Keith Haring and Jean-Michel Basquiat. While often associated with graffiti art, Hambleton considered himself a conceptual artist who made both public art and gallery works.

== Early life ==
Hambleton was born on June 23, 1952 in Tofino, Vancouver Island, British Columbia. He received an Advanced Diploma from the Emily Carr University of Art and Design in Vancouver in 1975. Hambleton founded and became a co-director of Pumps Centre for Alternative Art, a gallery, performance and video space in Vancouver where he had his first solo exhibition in 1976.

== Art career ==
=== Street art ===
Hambleton's early public art included his Image Mass Murder art. From 1976 to 1978 Hambleton painted a police "chalk" outline around bodies of volunteer "homicide victims." He then splashed some red paint on the outline, leaving behind a realistic looking crime scene. These "crime scenes" were done on the streets of 15 major cities across the United States and Canada. Like Hambleton's future "Shadowman" paintings, the Image Mass Murder "crime scenes" would often have the effect of startling or shocking passersby.

=== Shadowman paintings ===
It was in New York that Hambleton gained notoriety for his "Shadowman" paintings of the early 1980s. Each painting resembles a life-sized silhouetted image of some mysterious person, a "splashy shadow figure." These "shadow paintings" were splashed and brushed with black paint on hundreds of buildings and other structures across New York City. Locations were believed to be calculated for maximum impact upon unsuspecting pedestrians. Very often, a "Shadowman" could be found in a dark alley or lurking just around a street corner. Hambleton later expanded the scope of his project and painted these "shadowmen" in other cities, including Paris, London and Rome, and in 1984 he painted 17 life-size figures on the East side of the Berlin Wall, returning a year later to paint more figures on the West side of the wall. In 1983, during Malcolm McLaren's fashion design partnership with Vivienne Westwood, they collaborated with Hambleton to create a "Shadowman" jersey skirt.

=== Gallery works ===
After his public art, Hambleton produced a variation of his "shadow" work, showing his "Shadowman" as a sort of "rodeo man", or rugged "Marlboro Man", often riding a bucking horse. This series was painted on canvas and other materials, where they could be displayed as works of art. Inspired by the Marlboro magazine advertisements, which in some ways exploited the image of a uniquely "American hero" to sell its product, Hambleton appropriated and modified the image to create a new series of work.

Hambleton showed at the Piezo Electric Gallery during the Lower East Side art movement of 1983–1985. He showed in 1984 at the Salvatore Ala Gallery in NYC when it was noted by The New York Times the artist began to start concentrating on studio painting after "gaining a reputation for his urban works, notably shadowy figures painted on walls of New York buildings." Criticism of his new emphasis on studio works defined his style, "Hambleton can handle paint. When he throws white or black on the canvas, his waves break, his rodeo rider bucks, a man shot seems blown apart.”

In the early nineties, Hambleton began to withdraw from the art scene. Many of his friends and collaborators, including Jean-Michel Basquiat and Keith Haring, had died. Hambleton "became increasingly weary of the art business" and its impact on his artistic freedoms. In 2007, a solo exhibition was produced, featuring the "Beautiful Paintings" at Woodward Gallery in NYC.

Hambleton stated that this work was a reaction against the abundance of figurative painting displayed in galleries at the time, to which he chose not include figurative work of his own. Hambleton said that he also intentionally sought out a different mood, "with a different sensibility," from his previous work.

== Exhibitions ==
During his career, Hambleton's works have been shown internationally, including paintings on canvas and paper of his "shadow" work. He was included in the Venice Biennale in 1984 and 1988. Among group exhibitions in 1984, he participated in Arte di Frontiera: New York Graffiti, an Italian exhibition visited by thousands of spectators, that toured in three towns starting at the Galleria Comunale d'Arte Moderna, Bologna, with a catalog by Mazzotta then to the Arengario del Duomo in Milano, and then the Palazzo delle Esposizioni in Rome.

In 2009 from September 15, the works of Hambleton were displayed in an exhibition entitled "Richard Hambleton - New York". Thirty-five pieces of Hambleton's work, spanning from the early 1980s to the present were exhibited, showing his "Shadowman" and "Marlboro Man" works on canvas (and other materials), presented side-by-side with his "Beautiful Paintings". The exhibition toured to multiple venues that included the Moscow Museum of Modern Art.

At the 2010 annual AIDS charity amfAR dinner party, held during the Cannes Film Festival, two of Hambleton's painting were auctioned for a combined $920,000.00, to help raise funds for AIDS research.

Hambleton's last show during his lifetime was a pop-up exhibition after the first Tribeca Film Festival screening of the documentary about his life presented by Red Splat Productions and Gallery X. Additionally "Just Say Stop" a Stop Sign Series, which were painted on ten stop signs, were exhibited at the Tribeca Film Festival in 2017 during the showing of the documentary chronicling the artist’s career, Shadowman.

In 2024, an exhibition titled, "Richard Hambleton: The Last Shadows", organized by HKWalls in Hong Kong. Featuring the last artworks by Hambleton and some never before seen works, the show opened on January 12 and was co-curated by Edward Straka, Alasdair Pitt and HKwalls.

== Media mentions ==
Shadowman, a film about Hambleton by director Oren Jacoby, premiered at the Tribeca Film Festival on April 21, 2017. The film covers his meteoric rise to success in the New York art scene, as well as his widely reported struggle with drug addiction.

The album Clics Modernos by the Argentine musician Charly García features one of Richard's "Shadowman" paintings on the cover photo.

== Death ==
Hambleton died on October 29, 2017, of cancer at the age of 65.
