= Wayne Art Center =

Art gallery and educational center

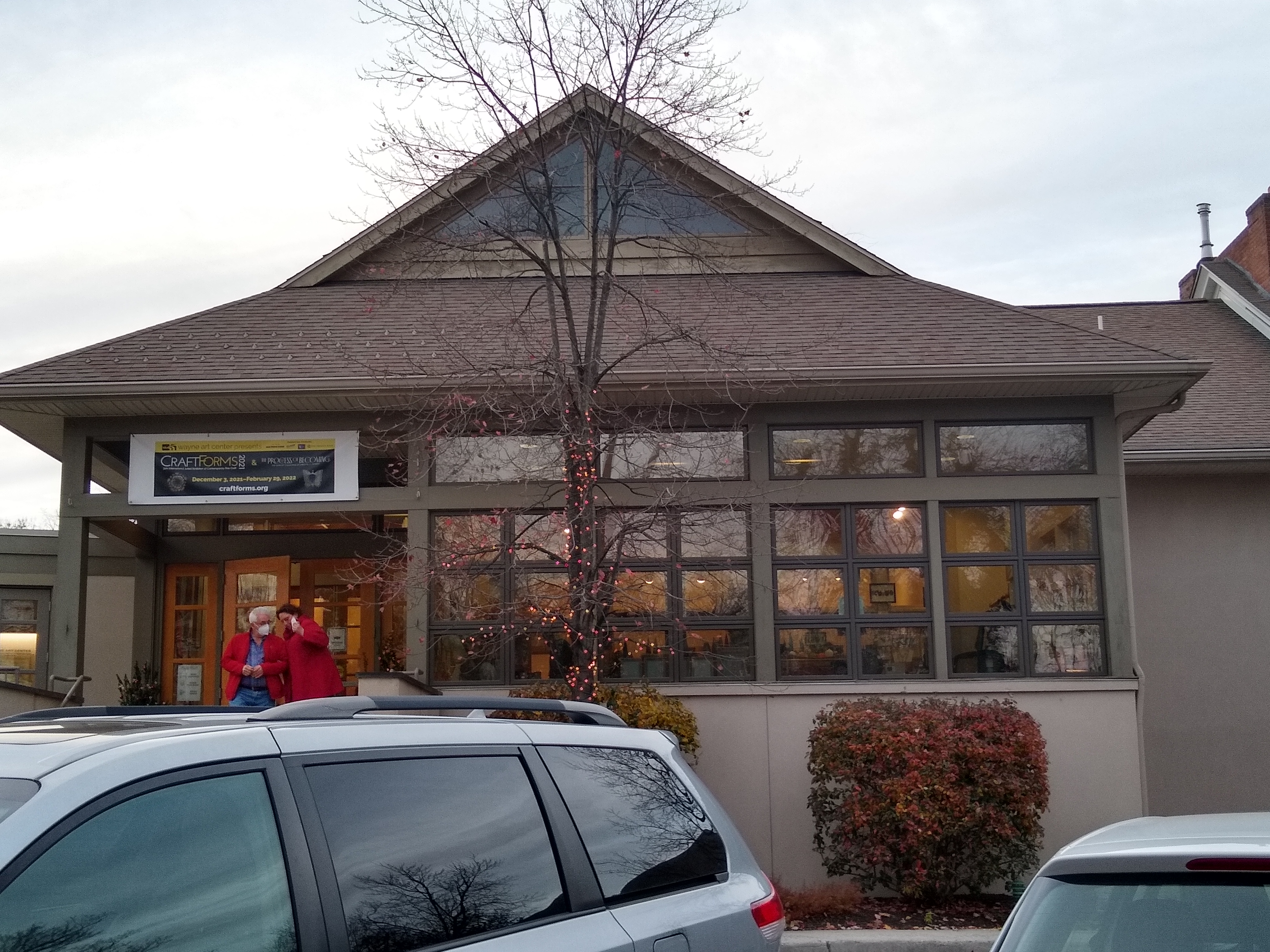
- Established: 1931; 95 years ago
- Location: Wayne, Pennsylvania, United States
- Type: Art center
- Director: Nancy Campbell
- Website: www.wayneart.org

External videos
- “AQE 2022, The 15th International Juried Exhibition of Contemporary Fine Art Quilts at the Wayne Art Center“
- “Wayne Art Center Student Works 2017 Exhibition”

The Wayne Art Center is a non-profit art center in Wayne, Pennsylvania that has offered classes, lectures, events and exhibitions for more than 90 years. The Wayne Art Center was organized in 1931 and incorporated in 1932 during the Great Depression. Its mission was to share joy in beauty and art among the broader community.

The Center's current executive director is Nancy Campbell, who took over the position in 1987. Each year the Wayne Art Center offers approximately 500 classes to around 5,000 students. In December, it hosts the annual CraftForms exhibition, a juried show of national and international craft artists. Through events such as its biennial juried quilt exhibition, Art Quilt Elements, the Center focuses on craftsmanship and the use of traditional media by modern craft artists.

== History ==
The Wayne Art Center was first established during the Depression. Twenty-two interested citizens met on March 5, 1931 at the apartment of Miss Mary Walsh, to discuss “what might be done in Wayne for persons either out of work or with surplus leisure time at their disposal, by providing a suitable place for them to go, with opportunities to engage in avocational pursuits, or, more specifically, opportunities for self-expression.” After two more meetings it was resolved “that an Arts and Crafts Centre be started to encourage the appreciation of the arts by instruction and by providing workshops and a place in which exhibitions may be held.” On May 14, 1931, organizers chose the name "The Wayne Art Center".

On May 28, 1931, a rental agreement was signed for large carriage house or garage on the Humbert B. Powell property on Windermere Avenue. The Center immediately began to offer classes under volunteer teachers and held its first exhibition of student artwork in September, 1931.

On January 6, 1932, the organization filed for incorporation with the Commonwealth of Pennsylvania, and on January 29, 1932 the Wayne Art Center's charter was approved. The members, and the teachers, included both men and women. The first president was Miss Mary L. Walsh, with vice-presidents Henry R. Harris and Edmund deForest Curtis.

In October, 1932, unable to meet the costs of renting, the Wayne Art Center received permission from the Radnor Township School Board to use a classroom in the Radnor High School. By 1938, the Art Center had moved to a large barn on the property of Mrs. Craig Atmore at 314 Louella Avenue. In 1953, the organization moved to 413 Maplewood Avenue in Wayne, Pennsylvania, where it remains.

The initial 2,600-square-foot building was expanded to 9,000 square feet. Next the organization bought an adjacent Masonic Hall. In 2007, the two buildings were connected, to create a 28,000 square foot center.

== Recurring exhibitions ==
For a week each May, as part of the Plein Air Festival, artists paint outdoors throughout the Philadelphia area. Results are exhibited at the Center through June 30.

In December the Center hosts the annual CraftForms exhibition, a juried show of national and international craft artists. The first CraftForms exhibition occurred in 1994. The 2021 show was juried by Carol Sauvion, executive director of the non-profit Craft in America, which produces the television series of the same name. The 2021 CraftForms's best-in-show award went to ikat weaver Mary Zicafoose.

In 2014, the gallery began adding a second December exhibition as a companion show. In December 2021, the gallery showcased 100 carefully selected pieces in the exhibition The Process of Becoming: The Jewelry Collection of Carolyn L.E. Benesh. With her husband Robert K. Liu, Benesh was a founder of Ornament magazine.

The Wayne Art Center also holds Art Quilt Elements, a biennial international juried contemporary quilt exhibition. The exhibition is intended to increase public awareness of contemporary art quilts, and includes both established and emerging artists. The jurors for AQE 2022, the fourteenth exhibition, were Jane Milosh, Paula Nadelstern and Jason Pollen. They selected 50 works from 780 submissions for the exhibition.
