= Mary Zicafoose =

American textile artist

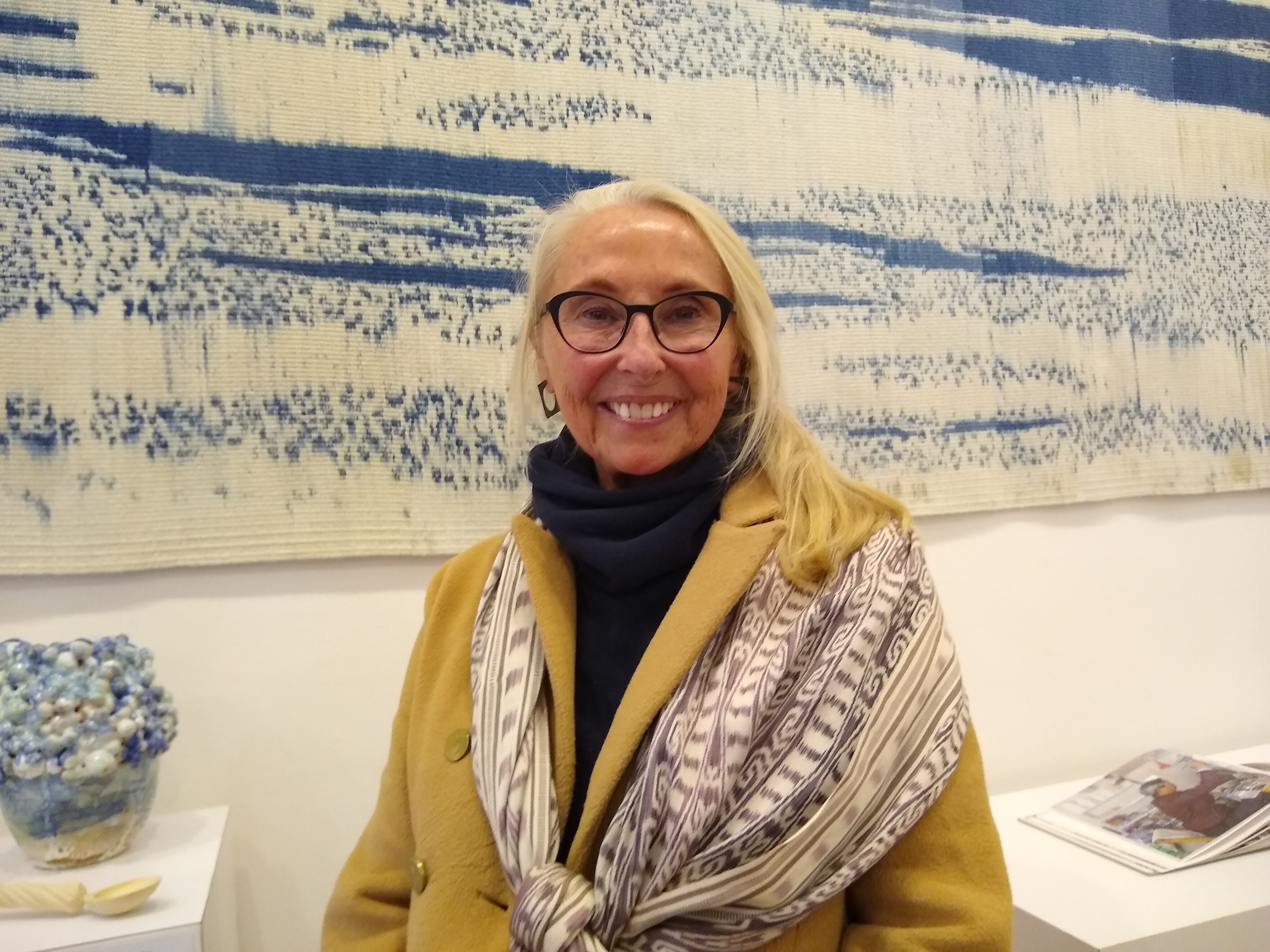
- Mary Zicafoose, in front of Sandhill Crane Count, Week Number 7, Platte River, 2021
- Born: Mary Brelowski
- Education: St. Mary's College, Notre Dame, IN
- Known for: Ikat weaving
- Website: www.maryzicafoose.com

External videos
- “Mary Zicafoose”, Directed by Jeffrey Hahn, Midway Film
- “Fault Lines: Mary Zicafoose“, 2017

Mary Zicafoose is an American textile artist, weaver, and teacher who specializes in ikat, an ancient technique in which threads are wrapped, tied and resist-dyed before weaving. Zicafoose is the author of Ikat: The Essential Handbook to Weaving Resist-Dyed Cloth (2020). Her works are part of private and public collections, including at least 16 embassies around the world as part of the U.S. Art in Embassies Program.

== Education ==
Mary Zicafoose (née Brelowski) grew up in Niles, Michigan. Zicafoose studied photography and received her BFA in 1973 at St. Mary’s College at the University of Notre Dame, Indiana. She then moved to Chicago, studying at the Art Institute of Chicago and later to Nebraska, studying at the University of Nebraska–Lincoln. During this time, she worked in clay and made "functional and beautiful tableware". She also lived in the Bolivian rainforest for year before settling in Omaha, Nebraska, in 1996.

Zicafoose is predominantly self-taught in her textile work. She first used a loom to weave while studying for an MFA, and the experience proved so transformative that she chose to leave the clay program at the University of Nebraska–Lincoln to pursue weaving. She credits the "generosity, patience, and honed skills" of members of the Handweavers Guild of Lincoln, Nebraska, in helping her to learn her craft. Zicafoose has also traveled internationally and studied the traditions of ikat work in different countries.

Many of her early works were rugs. In 1984 she began working with a 45-inch-wide (110 cm) loom. Later she began using a 72-inch-wide (180 cm) Macomber loom. As of 2004, her two working looms were a 64-inch-wide (160 cm) Macomber and a 96-inch-wide (240 cm) Cranbrook.

== Textile work ==
Ikat weavings are the result of a complicated process in which threads for weaving are laid out, wrapped and tied with tapes, submerged in dye vats, removed, untied and dried, and eventually used for weaving. Wrapped sections of thread tend to resist the dye, but the results are unpredictable, as some dye can wick under the tape. This gives the pieces spontaneity, a "serendipitous alchemy" of "new and unexpected colors".

Zicafoose dyes all her own yarns, often repeatedly overdyeing the yarn to achieve rich, deep colors. She has developed a personal library of over 1,000 dye recipes. She is known for her use of bold, saturated color, inspired by both ancient textile traditions and the works of modern artists like Mark Rothko.

Zicafoose is known for making extremely large pieces of weft-face ikat, which can be many feet in length. A 10 by 10 feet (3.0 by 3.0 m) piece woven of silk thread might require 80,000 ikat ties, each of which must be wrapped, tied, and then untied again after dyeing. Preparation of the thread for a piece, even with the help of studio assistants, can take more than a year before Zicafoose starts the actual weaving.

The work requires careful, painstaking planning. When developing a design, Zicafoose begins with a small sketch, then creates a line drawing to scale on graph paper, and finally a full-size color mock-up that she will refer to as she works on the actual piece. Zicafoose describes the process:

Ikat is based on math, geometry, dye chemistry, and the ability to think and design abstractly — expanding shapes and images at the ikat board to then severely compress them at the loom. It also requires an abnormal otherworldly amount of patience with process.

The work takes weeks. As the planet speeds along, the weaver sits hour by hour, day by day, slowly and steadily building a tapestry ... Nothing in the making of a tapestry happens quickly. It is a deep inward breath, a meditative activity that draws you in, not out.

She began The Blueprint Series during a residency at the Bemis Center for Contemporary Arts in Omaha, in 2008. Zicafoose considered fingerprints as universal indicators of personal identity. She wove an edition of seven Blue Print tapestries. The final Blue Print #7 presents two fingerprints next to each other across three panels. The triptych used 68,000 ikat ties and took three months to wrap. Zicafoose made three versions of this triptych, two using silk and another using wool.

Her paired pieces Hope & Healing, each larger than 12 ft × 9 ft (3.7 m × 2.7 m), used 1,000 skeins of yarn and took nearly a year to create. They hang together in the Fred & Pamela Buffett Cancer Center of the University of Nebraska Medical Center. The pieces include the words for hope and healing in 16 different languages. The center also hosted an exhibition of her works in 2018.

Zicafoose describes cloth as "a manuscript, a woven surface encoded with visual symbols". She often creates series of tapestries, carpets, and prints which explore aspects of a theme. Her collections include Ancient Texts, Blue Prints, Grasslands, Mountain for the Buddha, New Dreams, Sun Signs, Fault Lines, and The Blueprint Series.

The artist sees her work as a process of creation as well as a transmission of cultural record to future generations:

One cannot discount what can happen when a culture sits behind wheel and loom remembering, intentioning and giving birth in fabric. One cannot discount the power of cloth.

== Shows ==
Her work has been included in international juried shows such as the 13th International Triennial of Tapestry, May 10 – October 31, 2010, at the Central Museum of Textiles in Lodz, Poland. Her works have also been shown at the American Tapestry Biennials including #7 (2008), juried by Susan Warner Keene; #8 (2010), curated by Rebecca Stevens; and #9 (2013), juried by Lee Talbot.

As part of the United States Art in Embassies Program, her works are included in the permanent and lending collections of at least 16 embassies, particularly those whose countries have strong weaving traditions. These include Baku, Azerbaijan, Ecuador, Indonesia, Kazakhstan, Lithuania, Thailand, Sri Lanka and Yemen.

Zicafoose also produces collagraphic monoprints of works. Mary Zicafoose: Tapestries, Prints, and Carpets was the opening show for the relaunch of Gallery 72 in Omaha in 2013.

== Teaching and writing ==
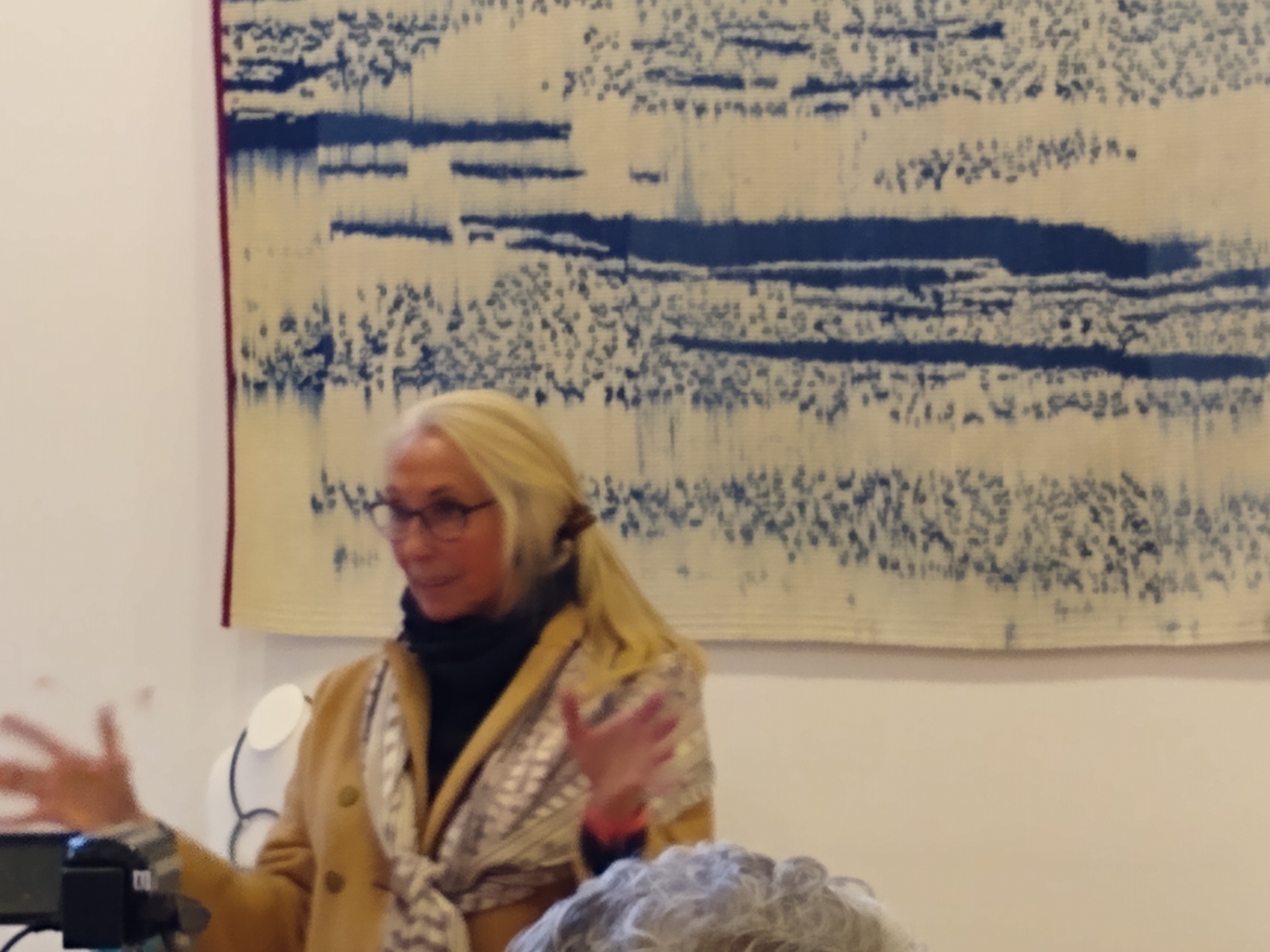
Mary Zicafoose, Wayne Art Center, 2021

Zicafoose speaks and teaches extensively, at venues including the de Young Museum, the Penland School of Craft, and the Arrowmont School of Arts and Crafts, as well as at conferences and workshops. She is described as a "generous teacher" who encourages her students to "trust the process".

She was invited to present on "Weft Face Ikat Applications in Wool & Silk for Contemporary Tapestry" at the 9th International Shibori Symposium at China's National Silk Museum in 2014.

Zicafoose is the author of Ikat: The Essential Handbook to Weaving Resist-Dyed Cloth (2020), in which she both technical and cultural knowledge. The illustrated book provides detailed instruction in techniques and appropriate tools for warp, weft, and double ikat. The projects are organized to sequentially to build upon each other, with technical instructions interspersed with essays on the cultural context of ikat fabric as it is made in Guatemala, Indonesia, India, Mexico and Uzbekistan.

== Community ==
Zicafoose has served on the boards of GoodWeave, an international organization combating the exploitation of child workers; the Robert Hillestad Textiles Gallery at the University of Nebraska–Lincoln; and the Union for Contemporary Art in North Omaha, Nebraska, among others. She has also been co-director of the American Tapestry Alliance.

In Nebraska, Mary Zicafoose and her husband Kirby Zicafoose have lived in Omaha and at Pahuk, a sacred ground for the Pawnee people located by the Platte River.
