= Jamie Bennett (artist) =

American jewelry designer (born 1948)

- Born: 1948 (age 77–78); Philadelphia, Pennsylvania, U.S.
- Occupations: Artist and educator
- Known for: Enamel jewelry

Jamie Bennett (born 1948) is an American artist and educator known for his enamel jewelry. Over his forty-year career, Bennett has experimented with the centuries-old process of enameling, discovered new techniques of setting, and created new colors of enamel and a matte surfaces. This has led him to be referred to as “one of the most innovative and accomplished enamellers of our time” by Ursula Ilse-Neuman, historian and former curator at the Museum of Art and Design in New York City. Bennett is closely associated with the State University of New York at New Paltz, where he studied himself as a student, and taught in the Metal department for many years. Bennett retired from teaching in 2014, after thirty years at SUNY New Paltz.

== Early life and education ==
Jamie Bennett was born in Philadelphia to Jean Grippi. Grippi was a single mother who moved to New York City at a young age and worked with dress designers Henry Rosenfeld and Joseph Whitehead. Jamie grew up spending his weekdays with his mother's sister and her family in New Jersey and weekends with his mother in the city. From his mother, Bennett learned early about the sacrifices of the artist's life, as well as a basic understanding of pattern making and construction.

Jamie's first college major was in business at New York University and then at the University of Georgia in Athens. However, by his senior year he was drawn to study painting, pottery and metalsmithing. Among the many teachers who influenced this change, and the professor who made the biggest impact on him, was metalsmith Robert Ebendorf. Jamie graduated in 1971 with both Bachelor of Business Administration and Bachelor of Fine Arts degrees. Soon after his graduation, Jamie's mother died. She had visited Jamie shortly before this and had approved his change in career. So in that same year, Jamie followed Robert Ebendorf to SUNY New Paltz to study metalsmithing as a graduate student. At SUNY New Paltz Jamie studied painting and was introduced to enameling by Kurt Matzdorf. Enameling combined his love of painting, color, and jewelry so this became his chosen path. Matdorf wasn't a particularly skilled enameler, so Bennett took a class at Penland School of Crafts with William Claude Harper, and continued to study from a text by the German artist Margarete Seeler, and experimented on his own. In 1974, he earned his Master of Fine Arts degree from SUNY New Paltz.

== Career ==
While still a graduate student, Jamie began to show in gallery and museum exhibitions. His first association with galleries came in 1972 and 1973 with shows at the Fairtree Gallery in New York City.

Soon afterwards, he got a job teaching at the Memphis Art Academy (now Memphis College of Art) from 1974 until 1979, and from there, he went on to the Program in Artistry at Boston University, where he taught until 1985. Bennett went on to teach at SUNY New Paltz, his alma mater, where he stayed for thirty years before retiring.

== Jewelry ==
According to Bruce Metcalf and Janet Koplos in their book "Makers: A History of American Craft" William Claude Harper who taught Jaime Bennett at a workshop at Penland was leading the revitalization of enameling in the 1980s. After this workshop Jamie developed a unique painterly approach using only opaque colors unlike the jewel-like enamels of his teacher Harper. He also pared down extraneous metalwork so the enamel became the focus. Around this time according to Metcalf and Koplos Jamie "began to cut his enamels into fragments and reassemble them in open, somewhat chaotic arrangements" and 'the juxtaposition of surface, color, and enameling techniques was entirely new to the medium". However, he thought these fragments were too flat and resembled a painting surface instead of an object, which is how he thought of his jewelry, and so wanted his enamels to be more three-dimensional. So "he turned to copper electroforming and ... he could enamel fully in the round." His early experiments looked like plant forms and lead to the "Rocaille" series which resembled ornate floral forms. This series lead him to think about ornamentation and connections to history and the ancient purposes of jewelry. Bennett and other jewelers of the time started looking at the basic meaning of jewelry which became a focus in 1990's. Through his original interest in painting and his ongoing work with enamel Jamie developed strong ideas about color. His reflections about how it is used in contemporary art jewelry were revealed in an article in a 2009 Metalsmith Magazine. He says, "The democratizing of color in jewelry has lessened some of the burdens of the "jewel." Enamelists can in effect make their own jewels in whatever color and shape the artist desires. In the mid-1980s and early 1990s color was embraced and exploited by the artist-jeweler. While the palette was less determined by new technologies like the anodized coloration of aluminum and the advent of "alternative materials" that defined the postmodern early 1980s, color was often used to achieve subversive objectives and challenge good taste. Various artists made a set of presumptions about color that aligned it with a critique of jewelry as tied to consumer culture." The art jewelers of the time were trying to free their work of the constraints of traditional jewelry in a variety of ways. "They assumed that, one, color was supplemental, not essential; two, color was a sensory confection undermining content and intent; three, color or "colorful" is gendered, undermining objectivity; and finally, color's association with traditional jewelry (precious stones, fanciful enameled objects) was mired in a hieratic stranglehold.”

== Selected exhibitions ==
Jamie Bennett has recently shown in exhibitions organized at the Metropolitan Museum of Art (Unique by Design), Tenimeni Luigi d"Alessandro (The Bright House), Antonella Villanova Gallery (Among Etcetera, solo show), Design Museum UK and the National Gallery of Victoria in Melbourne (Unexpected Pleasures), Sienna Gallery (Matter of Appearance), Villa Terrace Museum of Decorative Arts in Milwaukee, WI (Decorative Impulse), and most importantly by the Fuller Museum a retrospective (Edge of the Sublime, The Enamels of Jamie Bennett), etc.

== Awards and honors ==
Bennett is the recipient of numerous awards and honors including three National Endowment for the Arts Individual Fellowships and three New York Foundation for the Arts Fellowships. He became a Fellow of the American Craft Council in 2009.

== Public collections ==
Jamie Bennett's work can be found in the collections of Arkansas Decorative Arts Museum in Little Rock, Arkansas, Museum of Fine Arts, Museum of Arts and Design, American Museum of Art, Renwick Gallery, Smithsonian Institution in Washington, DC, Samuel Dorsky Museum of Art, New Paltz, Museum of Art in Oslo, Norway, Museum of Art in Trondheim, Norway, Los Angeles County Museum of Art, Metropolitan Museum of Art, Hiko Mizuno Collection of International Jewelry in Tokyo, Japan, Museum of Fine Arts, Houston, Musee des Arts Decoratifs, Philadelphia Museum of Art, Royal College of Art, the Victoria and Albert Museum, among others.
