= Nick Barraclough =

British radio presenter (born 1951)

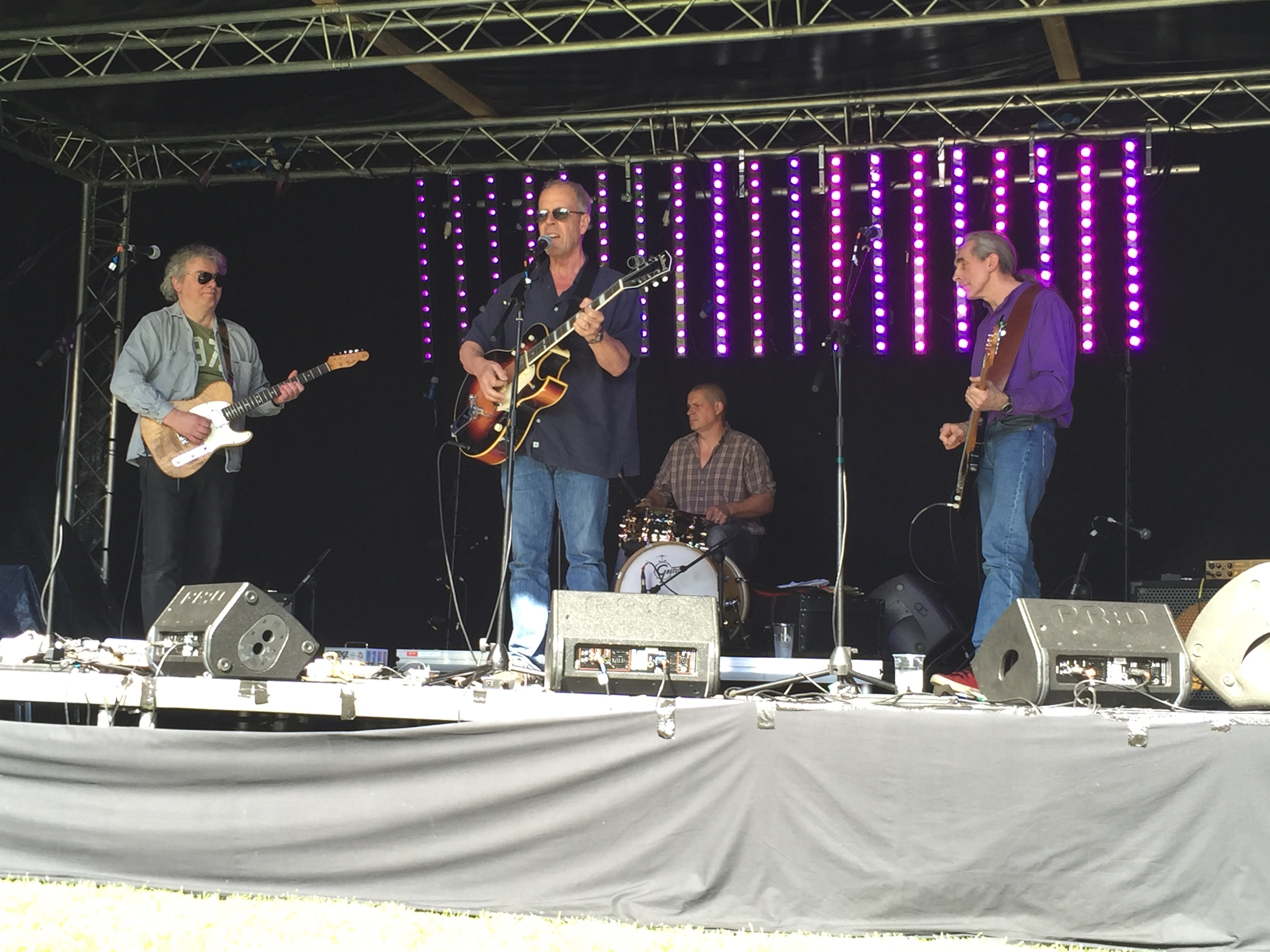
- Barraclough and the Pillars of Creation
- Born: Nicholas Stanley Barraclough; 1951 (age 74–75); Cambridge, England
- Presenting career
- Show: Various
- Station: Various
- Time slot: Various
- Country: United Kingdom
- Musical career
- Instruments: Guitar, bass, banjo, mandolin, dobro, pedal steel
- Website: www.smoothoperations.com/barraclough.htm

Nick Barraclough (born 1951) is a British radio producer, presenter, musician and writer, who is best known for hosting shows related to specialist American music. He had presented the long-running Nick Barraclough's New Country show for BBC Radio 2 between 1992 and 2007, and Smooth Country for the Smooth Radio network from 2007 to 2008. Between 2006 and 2013 he made a number of music-related documentaries for BBC Radio 4.

== Early career ==
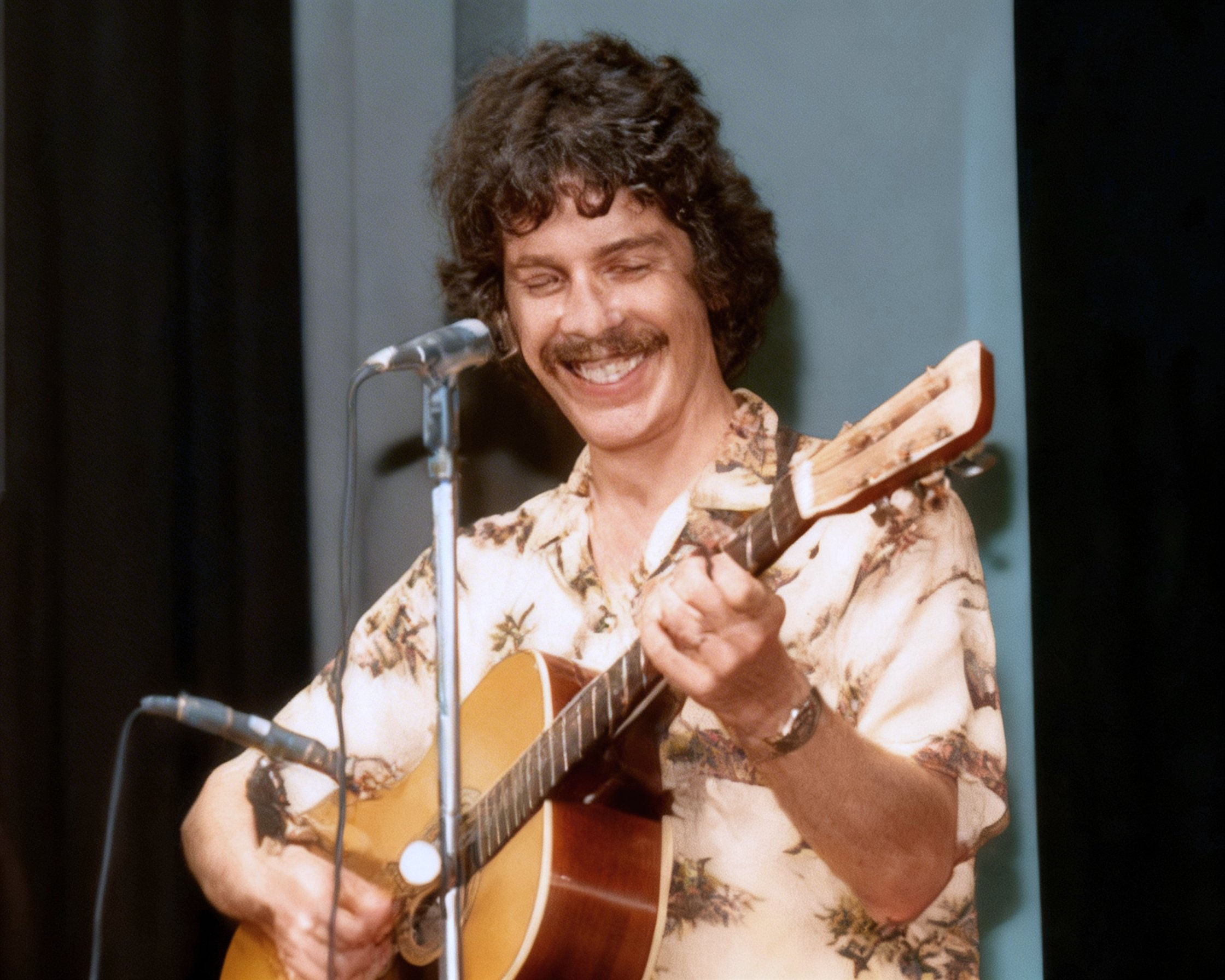
Barraclough in 1977, on stage with Telephone Bill and the Smooth Operators

For a number of years in the 1970s-early 1980s he worked as a musician in groups that included "Baby Whale", worked as one of the backing musicians for bluegrass artist Pete Sayers, and led the swing/blues/country band "Telephone Bill and the Smooth Operators", later revived in the 2000s under the name Burglars of Barcelona.

== Radio programmes ==
His career in radio began in 1982, with the launch of BBC Radio Cambridgeshire. There he hosted the breakfast show and was later a mid-morning presenter. In 1983, Barraclaugh's show moved to the Peterborough studio. In 1986, he moved to Manchester to produce programmes and sessions for Radios 1 and 2. While in Manchester he also wrote and produced the first definitive radio documentary series about Country music. The series was called "Hit It Boys", and was presented by Ricky Skaggs. After a year in Manchester, he moved to London, where he produced further documentaries, Radio 2's Gloria Hunniford, and Wally Whyton's Country Club.

With an upsurge of interest in the Country genre in the early 1990s, BBC Radio 2 was keen to put together a new show which would reflect the changes in the music, and its growing popularity. Nick's name was put forward. Consequently, Nick Barraclough's New Country was commissioned in 1992. An initial run of three months was planned, but the show quickly gained an audience, so became a regular feature of Radio 2's weekly schedule. It ran on a weekly basis until April 2007, when 'New' Country became indistinguishable from 'Mainstream' Country and the network felt it could no longer sustain two weekly specialist music shows covering the same genre.

Nick left Radio 2 and did a brief stint on Smooth Radio, where he presented the country music programme on Sunday evenings. Since then he has produced three major series for the Guardian Media Group; on the music of the Mississippi, New York's Brill Building and the West Coast music scene between 1960 and 2000, as well as several projects for Radio 4 and Radio 2.

== Producer ==
Nick founded the radio production company, Smooth Operations in 1992, initially to produce his long running show. He was later joined by former Radio 1 and 2 executive producer John Leonard. Smooth Operations went on to produce Mike Harding's folk show, Mark Radcliffe's late-night Radio 2 show, rock and soul strands and other documentaries and series for the Radio 2 network. Smooth Operations is now part of the 7Digital music group.

He has produced albums for Lizzie J Taylor, John Holder, All the Federales and The Pillars of Creation. In 2023 he released an album of his own songs, A Fool's Errand.

== Bibliography ==
In addition to his own memoir, he has written a novel based on the life of the artist Wesley West titled Kin: Blood Is Thinner Than Water, and the story of the Flying Pig, a Cambridge pub and venue, titled A Disorderly House.

- Barraclough, Nick; Hatfield, Justine (2018). "A Disorderly House": The colourful but murky, occasionally bawdy, and often really rather dodgy history of the Flying Pig. Ninja Barmaid Publishing. ISBN 978-1916492301.

== Accolades ==
In 2001, he was awarded the Country Music Association's International Country Broadcaster Award for his work on promoting country music in the UK.

In 2010 he was nominated for Best Music Entertainment Producer in the Radio Production Awards; for R.E.S.P.E.C.T., the Art of Backing Vocals.

== Personal life ==
Nick lives in Cambridge, with wife Judy.

== Sources ==
- "'Baby Whale' hook disc contract". Cambridge News. No. 25726. 9 June 1972. p. 20 – via British Newspaper Archive.
- "Bumper Birthday Party for 'Opry'". Cambridge News. No. 25960. 12 March 1973. p. 2 – via British Newspaper Archive.
- "It's the bright one... It's the right one... It's Master's Mix". Saffron Walden Weekly News. No. 12358. 27 October 1983. p. 32 – via British Newspaper Archive.
- "Overambitious event at CCAT". Cambridge News. No. 27083. 1 November 1976. p. 10 – via British Newspaper Archive.
- "Ricky Skaggs' 'Hit It Boys' Radio Two Series". Country Music Round-up. Vol. 10, no. 9. August 1986 – via Internet Archive.
- "Show People". The Stage. No. 4877. 3 October 1974. p. 12 – via British Newspaper Archive.
- "Sun and Guardian nominated for Radio Production Awards". Press Gazette. 13 January 2010. Archived from the original on 30 November 2024.
- "Superstars make it a great folk jamboree". Saffron Walden Weekly News. No. 11885. 1 August 1974. p. 3 – via British Newspaper Archive.
- "Telephone Bill calls back...". Cambridge News. No. 39177. 9 January 2003. p. 25 – via British Newspaper Archive.
- "UBC smooths in for radio deal". Manchester Evening News. 12 January 2013 [15 February 2007]. Archived from the original on 12 September 2026.
- Davies, Mike (2 June 2014). "Albums: Lizzie J Taylor – Living In The Lowlands". KLOF Mag. Archived from the original on 12 September 2026.
- Leonard, Lindsay (1 May 1976). "Folkweave". South Yorkshire Times. p. 52 – via British Newspaper Archive.
- Zayed, Alya (28 November 2019) [27 November 2019]. "Cambridge Flying Pig regulars 'exasperated' by major changes in the works for the pub". Cambridgeshire Live.
