= Kurt Matzdorf =

German-born American jewelry designer silversmith, goldsmith, professor (1922–2008)

- Born: Kurtheinz Julius Matzdorf; May 26, 1922; Stadtoldendorf, Lower Saxony, Germany
- Died: December 20, 2008 (aged 86); Kingston, New York, U.S.
- Resting place: Mount Pleasant Cemetery, Hawthorne, Westchester County, New York, U.S.
- Other names: Kurt Heinz J. Matzdorf, Kurtheinz J. Matzdorf
- Education: Slade School of Fine Art, University of Iowa
- Employer: State University of New York at New Paltz (1957–1985)
- Known for: metalsmith, jewelry designer
- Spouse: Alice Elinor Litt
- Children: 2
- Awards: American Craft Council Fellow (1992), Lifetime Achievement Award Society of North American Goldsmiths (2006)

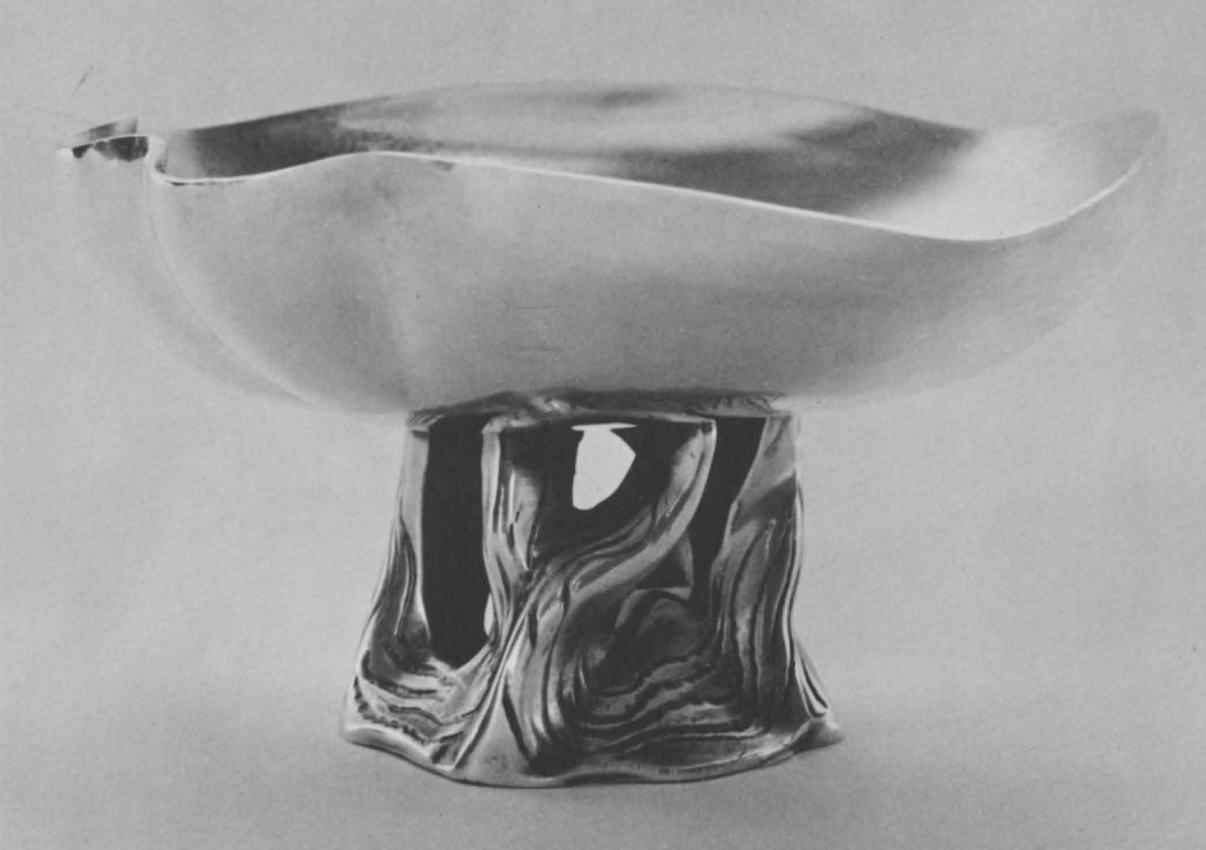
Kurt Matzdorf, 'Candy Dish' from American Metal Work, 1976

Kurt J. Matzdorf (1922 – 2008), also known as Kurtheinz J. Matzdorf, was a German-born American jewelry designer, metalsmith (which included silversmith, goldsmith) and an educator. He was Professor Emeritus at State University of New York at New Paltz and he founded the metals department. Matzdorf was known for his religious objects in metal.

== Early life and education ==
Kurt J. Matzdorf was born May 26, 1922, in Stadtoldendorf, Germany, to parents Alice Frank and Wilhelm Matzdorf. His family was Jewish. In 1939, he was brought to England on a kindertransport. His mother was either murdered in Chełmno extermination camp near Ljublin on April 20, 1941 or Hadamar Euthanasia Centre on February 11, 1941. His father was murdered in Sachsenhausen concentration camp on January 28, 1942.

During World War II, he attended Slade School of Fine Art in London and studied with the sculptor Benno Elkan in Oxford. In 1949, he moved to the United States, where he studied goldsmithing and metalsmithing at the University of Iowa.

He was married to Alice Elinor (née Litt) and together they had two children.

== Career ==
After completing his studies, he taught crafts at Kansas State University in Manhattan, Kansas, from 1955 to 1957. Matzdorf founded the metals program and taught at State University of New York at New Paltz (SUNY New Paltz), from 1957 until 1985. He was a Professor Emeritus of Gold and Silversmithing. In 1970, thirteen years after starting the metals program, he was joined by Robert Ebendorf. Matzdorf had notable students, including Barbara Seidenath and Lisa Gralnick.

Matzdorf was known for his contemporary Judaica silversmithing and goldsmithing, and he created objects like menorahs, kiddush cups, and synagogue jewelry. In 1992, Matzdorf was awarded the title Fellow by the American Craft Council (ACC). In 2006, he was awarded the Lifetime Achievement Award from the Society of North American Goldsmiths. He also designed and created a series of ceremonial maces and chains of office for colleges and universities in the United States.

His work is included in public museum collections such as at the Jewish Museum, Jüdisches Museum Berlin, Museum of Fine Arts, Houston, among others.

== See also ==
- Bernard Bernstein (1928–2021) American metalsmith, and teacher
