= Susie Ganch =

American artist (born 1970)

- Born: 1971; Appleton, Wisconsin
- Education: BS University of Wisconsin-Madison; MFA: University of Wisconsin-Madison
- Spouse: Jerod Eisenshtadt
- Elected: President Elect, Ethical Metalsmiths
- Website: susieganch.com

Susie Ganch (b. 1971 Appleton, Wisconsin) is a first generation American artist of Hungarian heritage. She is a sculptor, jeweler, educator, and founder and director of Radical Jewelry Makeover. Ganch received her Bachelors in Science from the University of Wisconsin-Madison in Geology in 1994 and her Masters in Fine Arts from the University of Wisconsin-Madison in 1997.

Ganch's work has been shown nationally and internationally. Her work is in the collection of the Los Angeles County Museum of Art, Los Angeles, CA Her work, Drag, was acquired by the Smithsonian American Art Museum as part of the Renwick Gallery's 50th Anniversary Campaign.

Ganch works as an Associate Professor and Metal Area Lead at Virginia Commonwealth University.

== Artwork ==
=== Sculpture ===
Drag (2013-2014) at the Renwick Gallery in Washington, DC in 2022

Ganch's background in Geology has heavily influenced her work that has centered on conversations about the environment, consumption, beauty, and adornment. Ganch frequently repurposes and utilizes such materials as plastic utensils and coffee cup lids en masse for her sculptures. "With these works, Ganch undermines the viewer's reaction; this is not just well-composed garbage. Rather, she reframes the three-dimensional objects with photographs or suggestive titles, directly alluding to questions about consumerism, ethical standards of global retailers, and mass production… Ganch places implication equally on buyer and producer as the innumerable individual parts are held together to form a gestalt."

=== Jewelry ===
Ganch received her training in jewelry while attending University of Wisconsin- Madison for her MFA, and additional training at California College of Art, Revere Academy of Jewelry Arts, and Penland School of Crafts. Her jewelry, particularly her enameling work, has been exhibited nationally and internationally, as well as included in several publications such as Metalsmith Magazine and several Lark Craft books.

== Selected exhibitions ==
=== Solo exhibitions ===
- 2015 Land and Sea, Sienna Patti Contemporary Lenox, MA
- 2014 Susie Ganch, Tributaries Series, Metal Museum, Memphis, TN
- 2014 Tied, Richmond Visual Art Center, Richmond, VA
- 2013 Glancing Back, Looking Forward, Sienna Patti, Lenox, MA
- 2010 Susie Ganch, 211 Gallery, University of Wyoming-Laramie, WY
- 2010 Bits and Pieces, Allen Priebe Gallery, University of Wisconsin-Oshkosh, WI

=== Radical Jewelry Makeover ===
Radical Jewelry Makeover (RJM) is collaborative project directed by Susie Ganch. Radical jewelry Makeover "uses the role of jewelry to educate students and communities about the complex issues surrounding mining." Radical Jewelry Makeover travels to hosting communities where participants are invited to donate unwanted jewelry to the project; donations range from plastic jewelry, to gold, diamonds, silver, stones, and bone. Participants break down, organize, and reuse the donations to create new pieces, extending the material's life span and keeping the original unwanted jewelry from landfills. Throughout the process, participants are taught about the environmental impact that mining for metals and stones has, and challenged to rethink their own participation in jewelry markets. At the end of the project, the remade pieces are then sold with the profits going to Ethical Metalsmiths.

== Selected grants, recognitions and residencies ==
- Virginia Museum of Fine Arts Fellowship, Richmond, VA, 2015
- Commonwealth of Virginia Commission for the Arts Fellowship in Crafts, Richmond, VA, Richmond, VA, 2008
