= Carol Sauvion =

American crafts scholar and patron

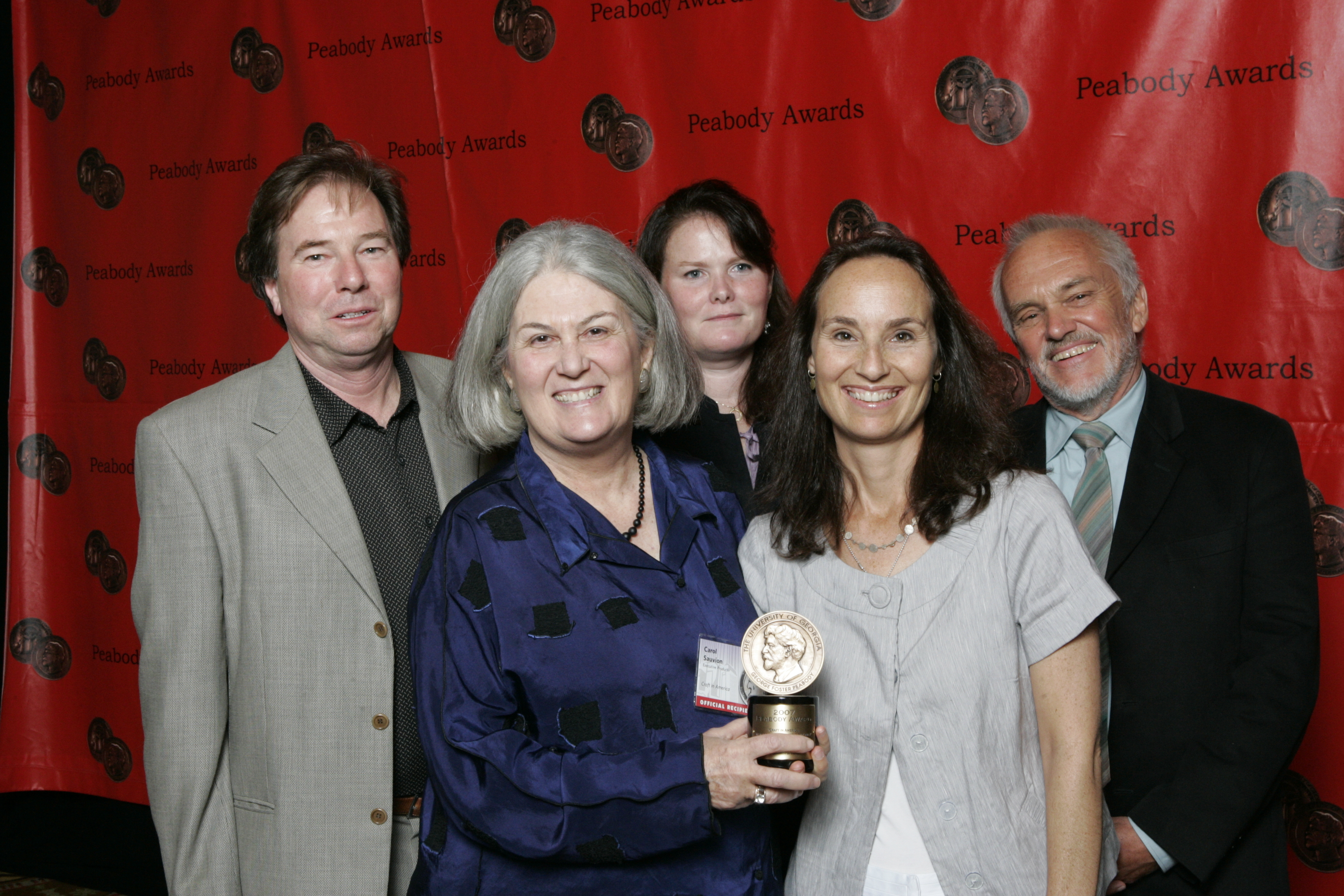
- Carol Sauvion and the crew of Craft in America at the 67th Annual Peabody Awards
- Born: July 29, 1947 (age 79); Philadelphia, Pennsylvania, U.S.
- Education: Manhattanville College
- Notable work: Craft in America, PBS Documentary
- Spouse: Don McLean (m. 1969; div. 1972)

Carol Sauvion (born July 29, 1947) is an American crafts scholar and patron, and the executive Producer and director of the PBS documentary series Craft in America.

Sauvion received a Bachelor of Arts Degree in Art History and American Art in 1969 from Manhattanville College in Purchase, New York. Living in New York's Hudson Valley, and married to singer-songwriter Don McLean (1969–1972). she was also in the world of music. Toshi Seeger, wife of folk singer Pete Seeger introduced her to ceramics. Sauvion recalls one 10-day interval when their husbands were away on concert tours. Toshi offered to teach her to use a potter's wheel. The two women "let go of time and did nothing but make pots, eat baked potatoes and rest when they had to, leaving a trail of clay from pot shop to beds."

Soon Sauvion, was producing functional porcelain and selling it at craft galleries and museum shops across the United States from 1969 to 1980. After Sauvion divorced and moved to New York City she continued as a studio potter, selling her Japanese-influenced work at craft fairs. In 1977 she and her second husband, Avram Reitman, moved to California. In 1980 she opened Freehand Gallery in West Hollywood, California specializing in handmade American crafts featuring artists from across the United States. Sauvion founded Craft in America, Inc., a Los Angeles–based 501(c)(3) non-profit organization, in 2003 to promote and advance original handcrafted work through educational programs in all media.

In 2007, the PBS documentary of the same name debuted.

In 2009, Sauvion established the Craft in America Study Center in Los Angeles, California. The research library houses craft and art-oriented books, periodicals, and videos. The center also mounts rotating exhibitions, hosts artist talks, hands-on-workshops, and various other public programs.

Sauvion served on the Board of Trustees of the American Craft Council, and was recognized for her decades of craft advocacy with the 2019 Distinguished Alumna Award from Manhattanville College.

On December 27, 2019, PBS Premiere's Craft in America's "Quilts" and "Identity", the twenty second and twenty third episodes in the series.
