= Craft in America =

American non-profit arts organization

Craft in America, Inc.
- Formation: 2004
- Founders: Carol Sauvion
- Type: Non-profit organization
- Location: Los Angeles, California
- Region served: United States
- Website: http://www.craftinamerica.org

Craft in America, Inc. is an American arts nonprofit organization known for its television series, also titled Craft in America, which showcases the world of craftsmanship across the United States.

== History ==
Craft in America is a 501(c)(3) nonprofit organization founded by Carol Sauvion in 2004. It is based in Los Angeles, California. The organization documents and promotes contemporary American and traditional craft practices through educational programs across various media. It aims to promote and advance original handcrafted work through programs in all media.

Craft in America's television series began in 2007. It is shown on PBS, and won a Peabody Award in the same year. In 2020, Craft in America was awarded the inaugural Decorative Arts Trust Prize for Excellence and Innovation for its plan to create a video dictionary of decorative arts tools, techniques, and materials.

== Projects and programming ==
The organization's projects include establishing the Craft in America Center in Los Angeles, California. The Center is used for hosting artist talks, curating exhibitions, authoring books and maintaining an archival library of books, magazines, DVDs and video footage on crafts.

The Craft in Schools educational outreach program connects students to professional artists with workshops and talks to underserved public schools in the greater Los Angeles area. The program offers pre-recorded educational guides and various other resources for use in classrooms.

== Television series ==
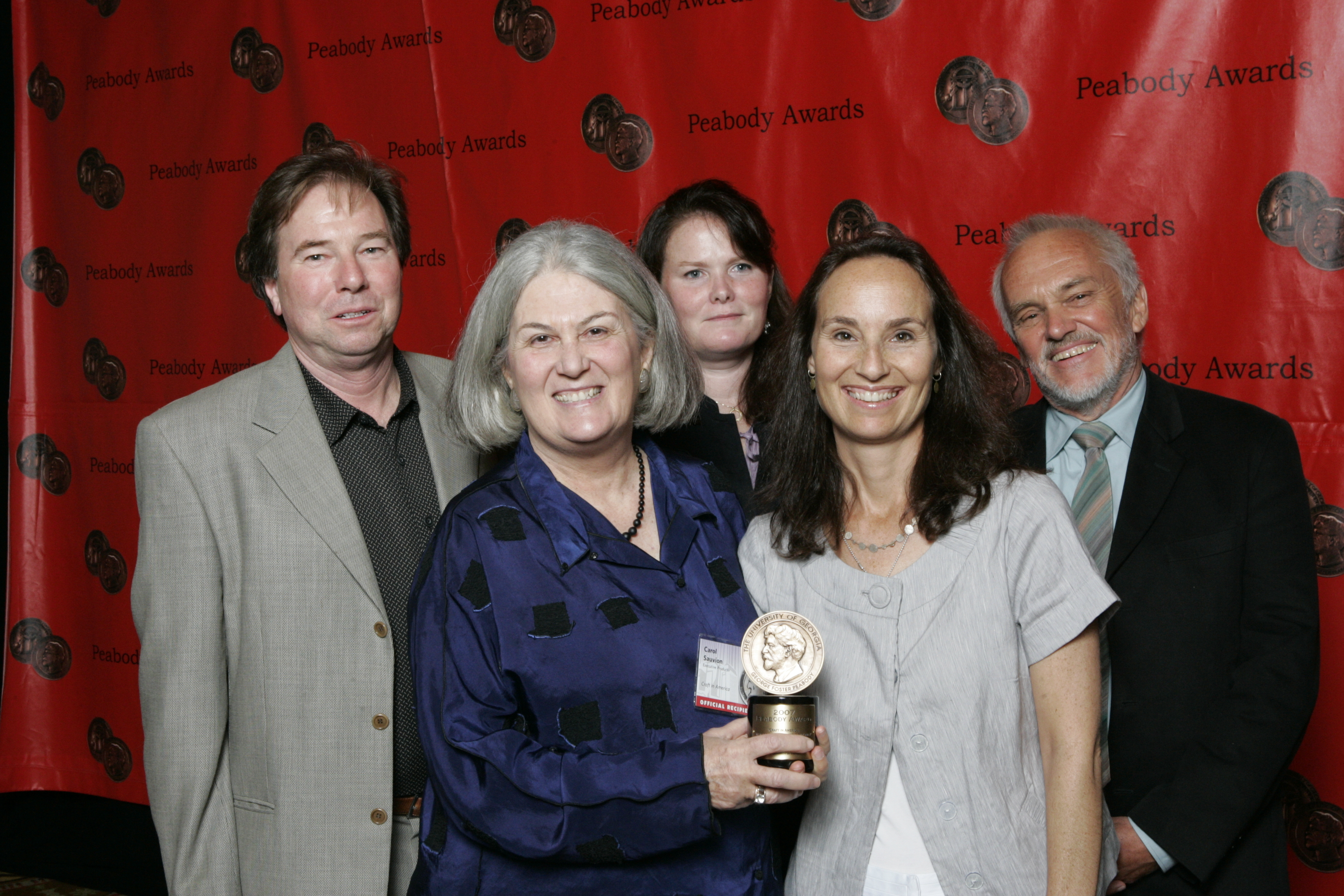
Carol Sauvion and the crew of Craft in America at the 67th Annual Peabody Awards

The organization received funding from the Corporation for Public Broadcasting and additional support from private donors in 2005. It then began production for three one-hour television documentaries on American craft. Craft in America, the Emmy-nominated and Peabody Award-winning PBS television documentary series premiered in 2007.

Each episode takes viewers inside the homes and studios of makers who talk about the process of crafting handmade works. Around two hundred artists have been filmed so far, including MacArthur Fellows bead worker Joyce J. Scott, woodworker Sam Maloof, and blacksmith Tom Joyce. Other artists include birch bark basket maker Dona Look, and Mira Nakashima, daughter of furniture maker George Nakashima. Episodes have highlighted numerous schools and craft institutions such as Pilchuck Glass School, Pewabic Pottery, Penland School of Craft, North Bennet Street School, Renwick Gallery, and the Smithsonian American Art Museum. The series is notable for its diversity of native and multi-cultural craft artists and more widely recognized practitioners.

The episodes "Borders" and "Neighbors" cross the southern border of the United States to focus on the United States and Mexico's shared history and influences. The project came about through Craft in America's participation in Pacific Standard Time: LA/LA, the Getty's exploration of Latin American and Latino art in dialogue with the city of Los Angeles, California. Producer and director Carol Sauvion described the episodes as carrying a message of international relatedness and cross-cultural exchange, affirming that there are no borders in art. The episode "Borders" features Mexican altar maker Ofelia Esparza, Mexican celebration Day of the Dead, American artist Kiff Slemmons, and other artists focusing on cultural exchange between Mexico and the United States.

"Neighbors," also set in Mexico, features ceramic artists Carlomagno Pedro Martínez and Magdalena Pedro Martínez, and also the work of American silver designer William Spratling. Its focus is the dialogue between Mexican craft artists and their American counterparts, including Judy Baca and the Social and Public Art Resource Center in Venice, California.

== Publications ==
- Lauria, Jo; Fenton, Steve (2007). Craft in America : celebrating two centuries of artists and objects : [... companion to the Craft in America PBS television series and to the traveling museum exhibition of the same name] (1st ed.). New York: Clarkson Potter. ISBN 978-0307346476.
