= Robert Ebendorf =

American metalsmith and jeweler

Robert William Ebendorf
- Born: September 30, 1938 (age 87); Topeka, Kansas, U.S.
- Other names: Bob Ebendorf
- Education: University of Kansas (BFA, MFA)
- Known for: Craft, art and studio metalwork and jewelry
- Spouse: Ivy Ross (divorced)
- Awards: Fulbright Scholar (1964), Louis Comfort Tiffany Foundation (1965), Society of North American Goldsmiths' Lifetime Achievement Award (2014)

Robert William Ebendorf (born September 30, 1938) is an American metalsmith and jeweler, known for craft, art and studio jewelry, often using found objects. In 2003–2004, the Smithsonian American Art Museum organized an exhibition of 95 pieces, titled The Jewelry of Robert Ebendorf: A Retrospective of Forty Years.

== Biography ==
Born on September 30, 1938, in Topeka, Kansas, the son of Dr. Harry Ebendorf and Nomah Large, a homemaker. Starting at a young age, his father would take him to his paternal grandparent's tailor shop. There he would watch them work together, creating articles of clothing. He credits the time spent there, and his mother, with helping create his sensitivity to the world around him and leading him to choose a career in art.

Academics challenged Ebendorf due to a learning disability, dyslexia. However he excelled at sports, and was offered full scholarships for wrestling and football. With the encouragement of his high school art teacher, he instead decided to pursue art and chose to attend the University of Kansas where he received a Bachelor of Fine Arts degree in 1960, and a Master of Fine Arts degree in 1963. He was influenced by the jewelry designed by Irena Brynner and by Scandinavian art.

After graduation, Ebendorf received a Fulbright Scholar grant to study abroad at the State School of Applied Arts and Crafts in Oslo, Norway. He returned to Norway again in 1965 when he was awarded a Louis Comfort Tiffany Foundation grant. He stayed there until 1966, working in Fredikstad at Norway Silver Designs.

From 1967 until 1971, Ebendorf taught at the University of Georgia. Starting in 1970, Ebendorf joined Kurt Matzdorf in the metals department at State University of New York at New Paltz (SUNY New Paltz), where he remained until 1988.

In 1999, he was named the Carol Grotnes Belk Distinguished Professor of Art at the East Carolina University School of Art and Design. and is a board member of the National Endowment for the Arts.

== Recognition ==
The Smithsonian exhibition was held in the Renwick Gallery and traveled to other museums. Ebendorf's work has been published extensively, and displayed in galleries around the world. He was one of the founding members of the Society of North American Goldsmiths in 1970, and is an inductee of the National Metalsmiths Hall of Fame.

In addition to the Fulbright Scholarship and Louis Comfort Tiffany Grant, Ebendorf has received a National Endowment for the Arts Award, and American Crafts Council Award, and in 2005 was named a Master of the Medium by the Renwick Alliance. In 2014, Ebendorf was given the Society of North American Goldsmith's Lifetime Achievement Award in 2014.

The Smithsonian American Art Museum has four, the Metropolitan Museum has five, the Asheville Art Museum has two, and the Museum of Arts and Design has two Ebendorf pieces in their permanent collections.
