= American Craft (magazine) =

American crafts magazine

- Editor: Karen Olson
- Categories: Arts and crafts
- Publisher: American Craft Council
- Founder: Aileen Osborn Webb
- Founded: 1941 (as Craft Horizons)
- First issue: May 1979 (as American Craft)
- Final issue: December 2025
- Country: USA
- Language: English
- Website: www.craftcouncil.org/magazine

American Craft is a periodical magazine that documents crafts, craft artists, and both practical and creative aspects of the field of American craft. Originally founded by Aileen Osborn Webb in 1941 as Craft Horizons, the magazine has been published by the nonprofit American Craft Council under the title American Craft since November 1979. The print magazine's final edition appeared in December 2025, moving to digital-only production as of January 2026.

As of 1979, the magazine's monthly circulation averaged 40,000 copies, making it the main craft publication in the United States. As American Craft, the magazine developed "a more visual orientation as a coffee-table magazine". After the National Endowment for the Arts began to award grants to individual craftspeople in 1973, American Craft profiled major NEA craft recipients. However, its reviews were often limited to "one or two in-depth commentaries" accompanied by a "visual summary of shows".

Like its predecessor, which both "documented and shaped" the changing history of the American craft movement, American Craft has reflected the development of craft. Writers such as Ed Rossbach have examined the history of craft in its pages. In the 1980s Rossbach wrote a series of articles describing tensions between textile artists Mary Meigs Atwater, Anni Albers, Dorothy Liebes and Marianne Strengell in the 1940s. In 1993, the magazine marked its 50th anniversary and the national "Year of American Craft" with a commemorative issue profiling the previous fifty years. American Craft was described in 1994 as a "major scholarly periodical" of interest to both researchers and serious craftspeople.

American Craft's current editor is Karen Olson (2020-). Previous editors-in-chief include Deborah Pines, Pat Dandignac, Lois Moran (1980 to 2006), Andrew Wagner (2007–2009), Janet Koplos (guest editor, 2009–2010), Shannon Sharpe (deputy editor), Monica Moses (June 2010 to January 2018) and Megan Guerber (2018–2020).

== Archives ==
- American Craft magazine
- Digital archives for issues of Craft Horizons (1941–1979) and American Craft (1979–1990)
