= Marianne Strengell =

Finnish-American textile designer

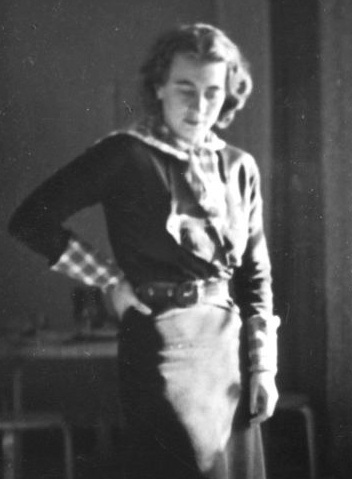
- Born: May 24, 1909; Helsinki, Finland
- Died: May 8, 1998 (aged 88); Wellfleet, Massachusetts, US
- Occupation: Designer
- Known for: Modern Textile Designer
- Spouses: Charles Yerkes Dusenbury, (m. 1940; div. 1948); Olav Hammarström (m. 1949)
- Children: 2, Sandra and Chris

textile designed by Marianne Strengell

Marianne Strengell (a.k.a. Marianne Hammarström, May 24, 1909 – May 8, 1998) was an influential Finnish-American Modernist textile designer in the twentieth century. Strengell was a professor at Cranbrook Academy of Art from 1937 to 1942, and she served as department head from 1942 to 1962. She was able to translate hand-woven patterns for mechanized production, and pioneered the use of synthetic fibers.

== Early life ==
Strengell was born in Helsinki, Finland, daughter of Finnish architect Gustaf Strengell and interior designer Anna Wegelius. She graduated from the Central School of Industrial Design in Helsingfors in 1929, then went to Stockholm where she assisted in the preparations for the 1930 Stockholm Exhibition. Strengell held several positions in Scandinavia, designing rugs, textiles and interiors. One of her earliest positions was as a designer at Hemflit-Kotiahkeruus where her mother, Anna, was director and responsible for starting a cottage industry in weaving for the farmers' wives. Strengell left Scandinavia for the United States in 1936.

== Career ==
In 1931 Strengell was invited by family friend Eliel Saarinen to work at the Cranbrook Academy of Art; she began teaching there in 1937. In 1942, when Loja Saarinen retired, Strengell replaced her as head of the Department of Weaving and Textile Design. Soon after, a power loom was installed in the weaving studios. She developed a curriculum that emphasized weave structure, versus the more pictorial imagery used by Saarinen. In her 25 years at Cranbrook, she trained many textile artists, including Jack Lenor Larsen, Robert Sailors and Ed Rossbach. Her circle of friends and colleagues included Harry Bertoia, Ben Baldwin, Ray and Charles Eames, Florence Knoll, and Eszter Haraszty. She maintained her role as Department Head of Weaving and Textile Design until she retired from Cranbrook in 1961.

While teaching at Cranbrook, Strengell held a number of outside consulting positions, and worked on industrial design commissions for architects, such as the interior fabrics for Eero Saarinen's General Motors Tech Center and work for Skidmore, Owings and Merrill. Her emphasis on texture rather than pattern influenced the American market in automotive and interior design. Her versatility in the development of new yarns and fabrics contributed toward the use of textiles as architectural elements. Strengell created original textile designs for automotive interiors for Ford Motor Company, General Motors Corporation, Chrysler and American Motors, as well as for United Airlines. Her upholstery design "Taj Mahal" for the 1959 Lincoln Continental is iconic. She sometimes worked in conjunction with her husband, architect Olav Hammarström, designing interiors and textiles for his projects. Most notably, they built and designed together the Vera and Laszlo Tisza House for professors Vera and Laszlo Tisza located in Wellfleet, Massachusetts, purchased four of the five original lots that comprised the Tisza property between August 1954 and September 1956 (Barnstable County Registry of Deeds 1954a, 1954b, 1955, 1956), and completed construction in 1960. Olav Hammarström and Marianne Strengell's own vacation home, which they designed for themselves in 1952, is located approximately 400 feet west of the Tisza property across Gross Hill Road.

In 1951, Strengell was sent by the International Cooperation Administration to Japan and the Philippines as a weaving and textile adviser to help establish cottage industries. Simultaneously she acted as a consultant there on weaving and textile production, for the U.N. Technical Assistance Administration. With her husband she developed a new loom to accommodate wider widths of fabric, and she incorporated native fibers, such as coconut and grass, into the textiles. Her efforts helped raise the standard of living in both countries. Strengell and Hammarström traveled the world, working, lecturing, and studying developments in architecture, arts and crafts, and the use of indigenous materials.

Strengell had more than 70 solo exhibitions throughout the United States and the world. In 1983 she began donating her textiles to museums, including the American Museum of Arts and Crafts, the Museum of Modern Art, the Cooper-Hewitt Museum, the Philadelphia Museum of Art, the Musée des Arts Decoratifs in Montreal, and the Museum of Applied Art in Helsinki, Finland.

Example of her design work are in the Art Institute of Chicago, the Metropolitan Museum of Art, the Minneapolis Institute of Art, the Museum of Modern Art, the Victoria and Albert Museum, and the Yale University Art Gallery.

In 1985 Strengell was named as a fellow of the American Craft Council.

== Personal life ==
She was first married to Cranbrook artist, Charles Yerkes Dusenbury, and had two children, Sandra, and Chris. She later married Olav Hammarström, and she died of throat cancer at their home in Wellfleet, Massachusetts on May 8, 1998.

== Exhibitions ==
- Finland 100: The Cranbrook Collection - March 21, 2017 - January 14, 2018 Cranbrook Art Museum, Bloomfield Hills, Michigan
