= Polly Barton =

American textile artist

- Born: 1956 (age 69–70); New York City, U.S.A.
- Education: Barnard College (BA); Fashion Institute of Technology; Parsons School of Design; Northern New Mexico Community College
- Occupation: Textile artist

Polly Barton (b. 1956) is an American textile artist.

== Biography ==
Barton was born in New York City. She graduated in art history from Barnard College in 1978 and lived and traveled in Paris, Florence, and Rome. In 1981, she moved to Kameoka, Japan, to study with master weaver Tomohiko Inoue, living in the religious heart of the Oomoto Foundation. She returned to New York in 1982 and continued to weave on her Japanese tsumugi silk kimono looms.

Barton shows her woven silk ikat paintings on both coasts, and is collected by the Art Institute of Chicago, Museum of Fine Arts, Boston, and by private collectors. Her work has featured in publications including Hali Magazine, FiberArts, Surface Design Journal and American Craft. She is a member of the Textile Society of America, Friends of Fiber Arts International, the Surface Design Association and the Textile Arts Alliance of Santa Fe.

== Education ==
- 1978 – BA, Barnard College, New York City, magna cum laude
- 1978 – Summer seminar, The Oomoto School of Traditional Japanese Arts, Kameoka, Japan
- 1981–82 – Kameoka, Japan, Apprentice to Master weaver Tomohiko Inoue
- 1982–83 – Fashion Institute of Technology, New York City
- 1984 – Parsons School of Design, New York City
- 1993–2000 – Northern New Mexico Community College, El Rito

== Exhibitions ==
2002:

- Threads on the Edge: The Daphne Farago Fiber Art Collection, Museum of Fine Arts, Boston, Massachusetts
- Survey Fiber 2002, Snyderman-Works Galleries, Philadelphia, Pennsylvania

2003:

- Opening Night, Linda Fairchild Gallery of Contemporary Art, San Francisco
- SOFA New York, Gail Martin Gallery, New York City

2004:

- New Works, Linda Fairchild Gallery, San Francisco

2005:

- SOFA Chicago, Jane Sauer Gallery, Chicago

2006:

- Material Difference: Soft Sculpture and Wall Works, Chicago Cultural Center, Chicago, Illinois

2007:

- Saturn Returns: Back to the Future of Fiber Art, San Jose Museum of Quilts & Textiles, San Jose
- Los Pintores: Past, Present, and Future, RSA along with FACT, Santa Fe
- Then and Now, William Siegal Gallery, Santa Fe

2008:

- Thread: Drawn, Dyed, Woven, William Siegal Gallery, Santa Fe
- Visible Presence, San Jose Museum of Quilts & Textiles, San Jose, California
- Woven Expressions, Gail Martin Gallery, New York City

2009:

- Origin, Shumei Arts Council, Pasadena, California

2010:

- New Work, William Siegal Gallery, Santa Fe
- New Fibers 2010, Eastern Michigan University, Ypsilanti, Michigan
- Transformed Traditions in Ikat, Modern Arts Midwest, Lincoln, Nebraska

2011:

- Sleight of Hand, Denver Art Museum, Denver, Colorado
- Instructors Exhibition, Penland School of Crafts, Penland, North Carolina

2012:

- New Woven Works, William Siegal Gallery, Santa Fe, New Mexico
- San Francisco Art Fair, Linda Fairchild Contemporary Art, San Francisco, California
- Sourcing the Museum, The Textile Museum, Washington, DC
- New Works, Gail Martin, New York City

== Public collections ==
- Art Institute of Chicago, Chicago
- Miho Museum, Misono, Japan
- Boston Museum of Fine Arts, Boston
- Daphne Farago Collection, Boston
- Guido Goldman Ikat Collection, New York City
- Davis, Polk & Wardwell, London, England and New York City
- Tobin Collection, Santa Fe
- Oomoto Foundation, Kameoka, Japan
- Cathedral of St. John the Divine, New York City
- Grace Cathedral, San Francisco
- Church of the Heavenly Rest, New York City
- Community Hospital Foundation of the Monterey Peninsula

== Honors ==
- 1984 – Best of Show Award, Convergence ’84, Dallas, Texas
- 1985 – Juror's Award, Juried Exhibition of the New York Guild of Handweavers, New York City
- 1986 – Stanley Mendelbaum Award, Juried Exhibition of the New York Guild of Handweavers, New York City
- 1997 – Honorable Mention Crafts, Taos Open, Taos, New Mexico

== Lectures and workshops ==
- 2001 – Summer Workshop: Ikat, Northern New Mexico Community College, El Rito
- 2002 – Boston Museum of Fine Arts, Boston
  - Textile Arts Alliance, Santa Fe
  - Summer Workshop: Ikat, Northern New Mexico Community College, El Rito, New Mexico
- 2004 – Design with Heart, Santa Fe
- 2008 – William Siegal Gallery, Santa Fe
  - Visible Presence, San Jose Museum of Quilts and Textiles, San Jose
  - Textile Arts Alliance, Santa Fe
  - Shumei, Crestone
- 2009 – Shumei, Crestone, Colorado
