= World Crafts Council =

International non-governmental organization

- Formation: 1964
- Founder: Kamaladevi Chattopadhyay; Aileen Osborn Webb; Margaret Merwin Patch
- Website: wccinternational.org

The World Crafts Council AISBL (WCC-AISBL) is a non-profit, non-governmental organization that was founded in 1964. The goal of the World Crafts Council is to encourage economic development of crafts through craft related activities, strengthening the status of crafts and craftspeople culturally and economically. The World Crafts Council was duly registered in Belgium as an international association without lucrative purpose (AISBL) as of November 8, 2012. It was accredited by UNESCO as of 2020.

The WCC is organised into five regions: Africa Region, Asia Pacific Region (WCC-APR), Europe, Latin America, and North America. Within each region there can be individual member organizations such as the World Crafts Council Australia and the Canadian Crafts Council.

At least 65 cities worldwide have received the WCC's designation of being a "World Crafts City", for preserving and continuing a rich heritage of traditional crafts and artistic work. World Crafts Cities include Meybod, Isfahan and Tabriz; Kuwait; Birmingham and Stoke-on-Trent, the Western Isles; Bornholm; Kuching; Kokand, and Trinidad de Cuba.

The achievements of individual craftspeople can be recognized by presentation of the WCC Seal of Excellence. As of 2024, the WCC was working to establish a Seal of Crafts Authenticity as a benchmark that could be used across diverse craft traditions to indicate their authenticity.

== Founding ==
As part of the 1964 New York World's Fair, Aileen Webb and others from the American Craftsmen’s Council organized the First World Congress of Craftsmen, an international conference which was held at Columbia University. This meeting served as the first World Crafts Council General Assembly. The invitees were an international group including craftspeople, artists, collectors, scholars, and curators.

On 12 June, 1964, the group formed the World Crafts Council. Founding leaders included Aileen Osborn Webb, Margaret Merwin Patch and Kamaladevi Chattopadhyay. Aileen Webb became the founding president, serving from 1964-1972. Kamaladevi Chattopadhyay became the founding vice-president. She later served as president of the Asia-Pacific Region of the World Crafts Council from 1976 to 1979.

“The purpose of the Congress was to bring together craftsmen from the world over—both the village artisan and the urbanised designer-craftsman—for a creative, technical, economic and social exchange. The Congress proved that when confronted with each other as artists people could meet in a friendly spirit and with deep understanding no matter what their race or politics. This is the first road toward bringing peace in the world.” Aileen O. Webb, 1964

== Activities ==
The council promotes fellowship among craftspeople through exchange programs, workshops, conferences, seminars, and exhibitions.

The World Crafts Council hosts a General Assembly every four years, while the regional groups tend to meet yearly. The Golden Jubilee Celebration Summit of the World Crafts Council was held from October 18-22, 2014, in Dongyang, China. The World Craft Council celebrated its Diamond Jubilee in New Delhi (November 22-24, 2024) and Srinagar (November 25-27, 2024), a recently-designated World Crafts City.

== Presidents ==
Presidents of the World Crafts Council include:

- Aileen Osborn Webb, United States (1964-1972)
- David Eccles, 1st Viscount Eccles, Scotland (1974-1978)
- Marea Gazzard, Australia (1980-1984), first elected president
- Siva Obeyesekere, Sri Lanka, first president from a developing country (1991-1996)
- Omar Amine Benabdallah, Morocco (1997-)
- Usha Krishna, India (2008-2013)
- Wang Shan, China (2013-2016)
- Rosy Greenlees, UK (2016-2020)
- Ghada Hijjawi Qaddumi, Kuwait (January-April 2021)
- Saad Hani Al-Qaddumi (April 2021-)

== See also ==
- Docomomo International – Organization to protect and preserve modern buildings
- World Design Organization – International association
