= Slivka =

Slivka is a Slavic surname. Notable people with the surname include:

- Rose Slivka (1919–2004), American magazine editor
- Vykintas Slivka (born 1995), Lithuanian footballer

== See also ==
- Śliwka
