= Slifka =

Slifka is a surname. Notable people with the surname include:

- Alan B. Slifka (1929–2011), American investor and philanthropist
- Scott Slifka (born 1974), American politician

== See also ==
- Slivka
