= Jan Yager =

American artist (1951–2024)

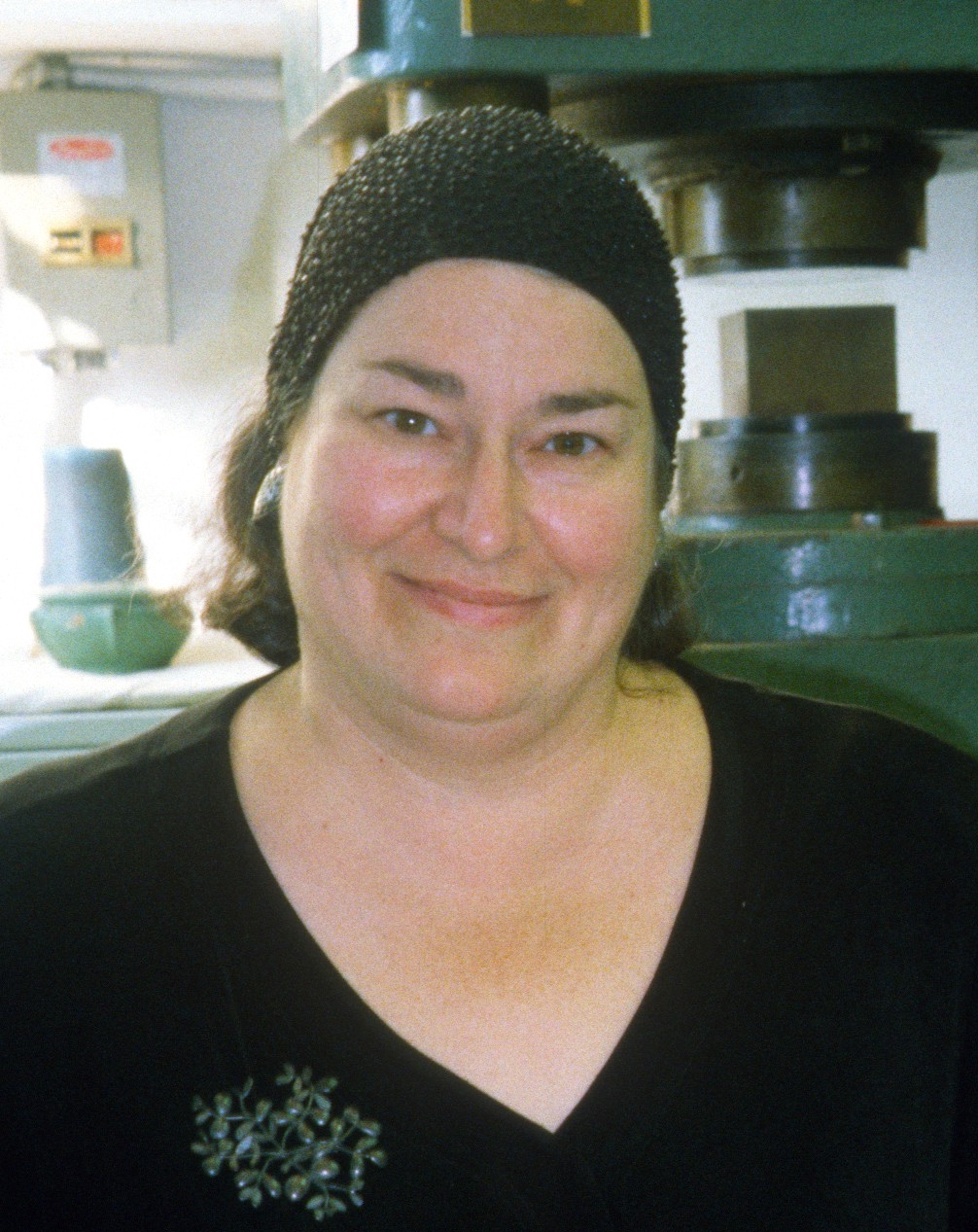
- Yager in 2001
- Born: October 9, 1951; Detroit, Michigan, U.S.
- Died: August 14, 2024 (aged 72); Philadelphia, Pennsylvania, U.S.
- Education: Western Michigan University, Rhode Island School of Design
- Occupation: Artist
- Spouse: Rick Shnitzler
- Awards: Pew Fellowship in the Arts, Anonymous Was A Woman Award, National Endowment for the Arts

Jan Yager (October 9, 1951 – August 14, 2024) was an American artist who made mixed media jewelry. She drew inspiration from both the natural world and the lived-in human environment of her neighborhood in Philadelphia, Pennsylvania, emphasizing that art is a reflection of both time and place. She incorporated rocks, bullet casings, and crack cocaine vials into her works, and found beauty in the resilience of urban plants that some would consider weeds.

Yager's design vocabulary is unusual in invoking "vast and collective networks of reference" that include the historic, the artistic, and the political. Her work is included in the permanent collections of the Philadelphia Museum of Art, the Smithsonian American Art Museum, the Museum of Fine Arts, Boston, the National Museum of Scotland, and the Victoria and Albert Museum (V&A) in London, United Kingdom, which featured fifty of Yager's pieces in a solo show in 2001 entitled "Jan Yager: City Flora/City Flotsam". In 2002, her Invasive Species American Mourning Tiara was chosen for "Tiaras", an exhibition of 200 tiaras at the V&A, and was featured on the back cover of the accompanying book. In 2007, Yager was featured in the PBS documentary series "Craft in America: Memory, Landscape, Community".

== Background ==
Janice A. Yager was born to Mary Linda (Parrish) Yager and Casper Yager Jr in 1951 in Detroit, Michigan. She graduated from Western Michigan University in Kalamazoo, Michigan, earning a B.F.A. in jewelry and metalsmithing in 1974.

She later attended the Rhode Island School of Design (RISD), earning an M.F.A. in 1981. She moved to Philadelphia, Pennsylvania, in 1983.

Yager established a studio at 915 Spring Garden Street, at that time the oldest and largest artist studio building in Philadelphia. Housing over 100 artists' studios, it was closed in 2015 after a small fire, and numerous code violations were discovered.

Janice A. Yager died from breast cancer in Philadelphia, on August 14, 2024, at the age of 72. She was predeceased by her husband Rick Shnitzler, and was survived by her daughter, Julia.

== Development of Yager's work ==
=== Whomp and Puff ===
During graduate school Yager was introduced to industrial machinery and began to combine machine and hand techniques to create "objects to hold". The surface texture of each piece was pressed into the metal initially with a drop hammer, and later a high-tonnage hobbing or coining press. Then the textured metal was puffed out into pillow shapes using a small hydraulic press. Each half-piece was sawed, soldered together, and finished by hand. Pieces in this "Whomp and Puff" series were praised for both their inviting forms and their patterned and textured surfaces. They were described as evoking the feeling of clay or fabric, and having a "contemplative spirit". Next, Yager began to combine forms as freely moving elements on distinctive thick segmented chains. These pieces were seen as interesting and playful, inviting "the wearer to participate in the piece by deciding the positions of the various components".

=== Rock Necklaces ===
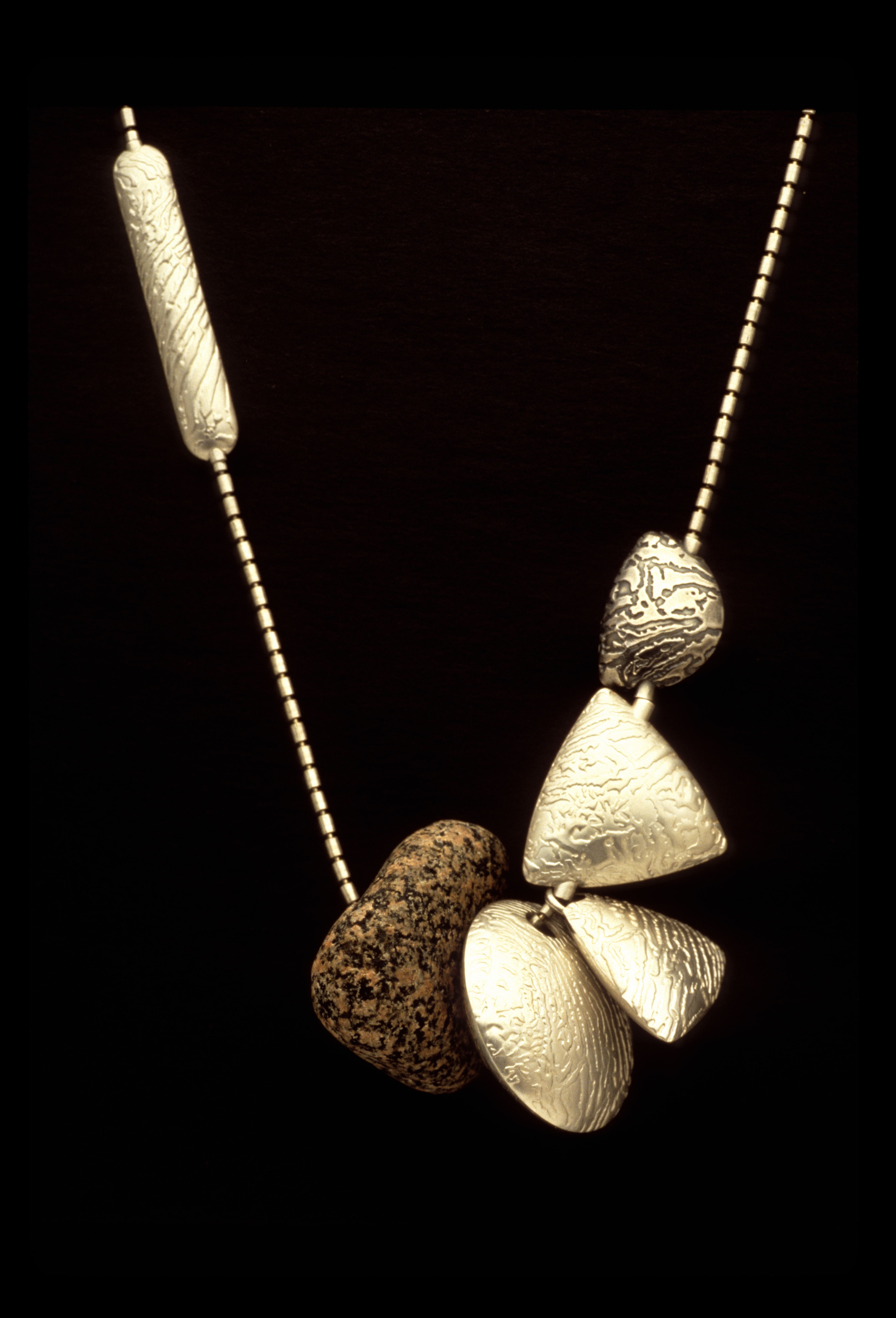
Rock Necklace, 1984, by Jan Yager

Yager gained national acclaim in the 1980s by combining her uniquely textured pillow-forms of 18k gold and sterling silver with water-polished natural stones, a juxtaposition that shocked some viewers. Many of the rocks and pebbles were collected while she was a student at RISD. Initially she used the rocks that she found as inspirations for the forms she was creating for her jewelry. In 1983, recognizing the "incomparable beauty found in nature", she began to include the rocks themselves in her "Rock Necklace" series. An example of this work is Rock Necklace with Ridge (1987), made of sterling silver and a gray beach rock, now in the permanent collection of the Smithsonian. Yager's jewelry of this period was exhibited and sold in both the New York trade shows and the American Craft Council wholesale/retail shows. It was published widely and commercially successful, and popularized tools and techniques by influencing other artists.

=== Time and Place ===
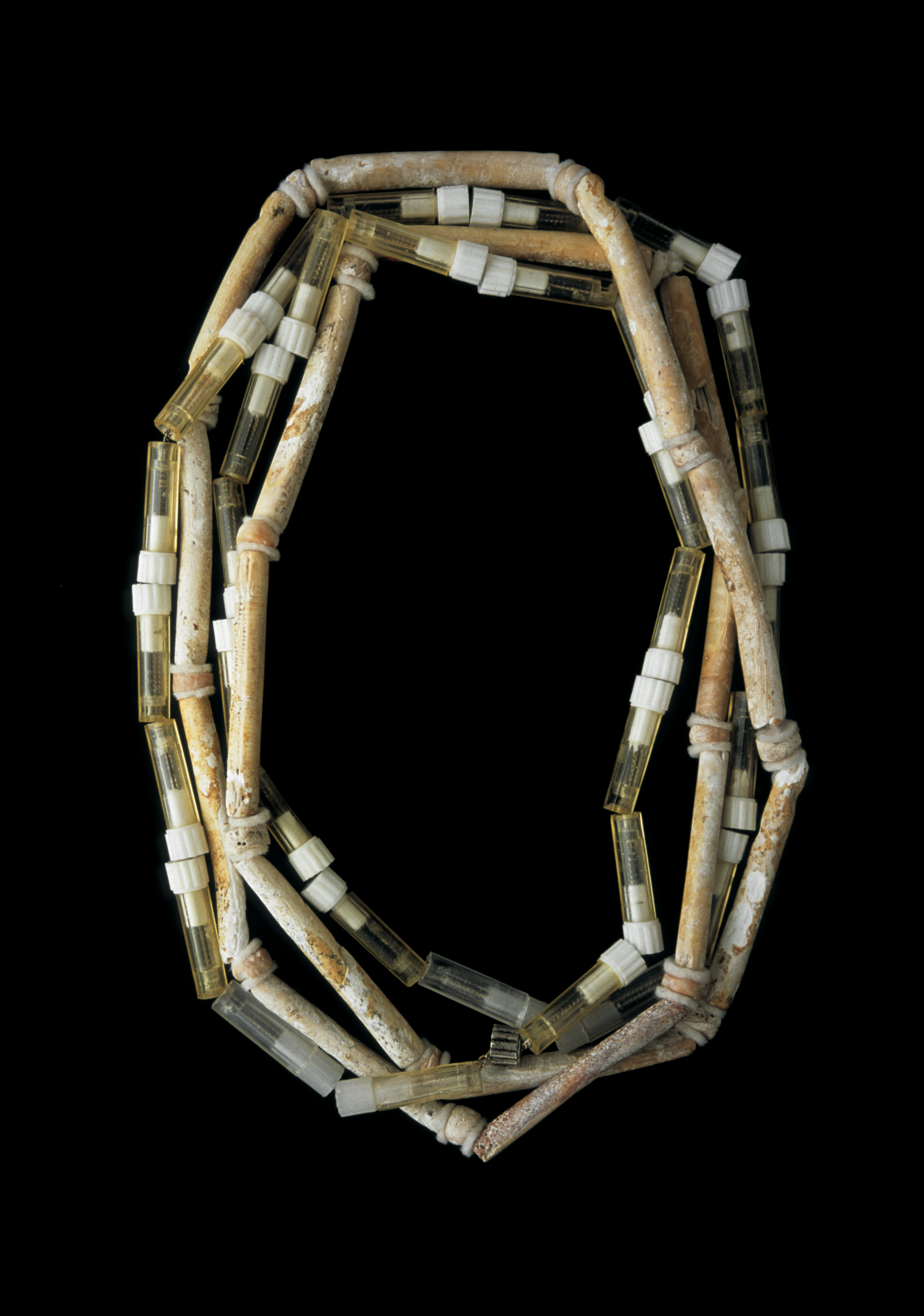
Crack Vial Neck Strand, 1990, by Jan Yager with Prehistoric Bone Neck Strand

In 1990 Yager gave herself a sabbatical. She took time off to study and rethink her approach, asking herself the question, "What makes art authentic?" She spent the next two years studying the history, philosophy, and practices of jewelry making, thinking about the ways in which an artwork is connected to the history of art, as well as the time and place in which it is made. Her goal became the creation of work that was "rooted in history, yet undeniably of its place and time."

A prehistoric Native American bone necklace inspired her to examine her own environment for readily available materials. After a wide search for inspiration, Yager narrowed her focus to the sidewalk outside her studio in North Philadelphia. Yager began to "beachcomb" the area in a search for inspiration in the things she saw every day. She found spent bullet casings, broken auto glass, and plastic crack vials and caps. Then she began to notice and closely study the plants that persisted in growing in cracks in the sidewalks.

=== City Flotsam ===
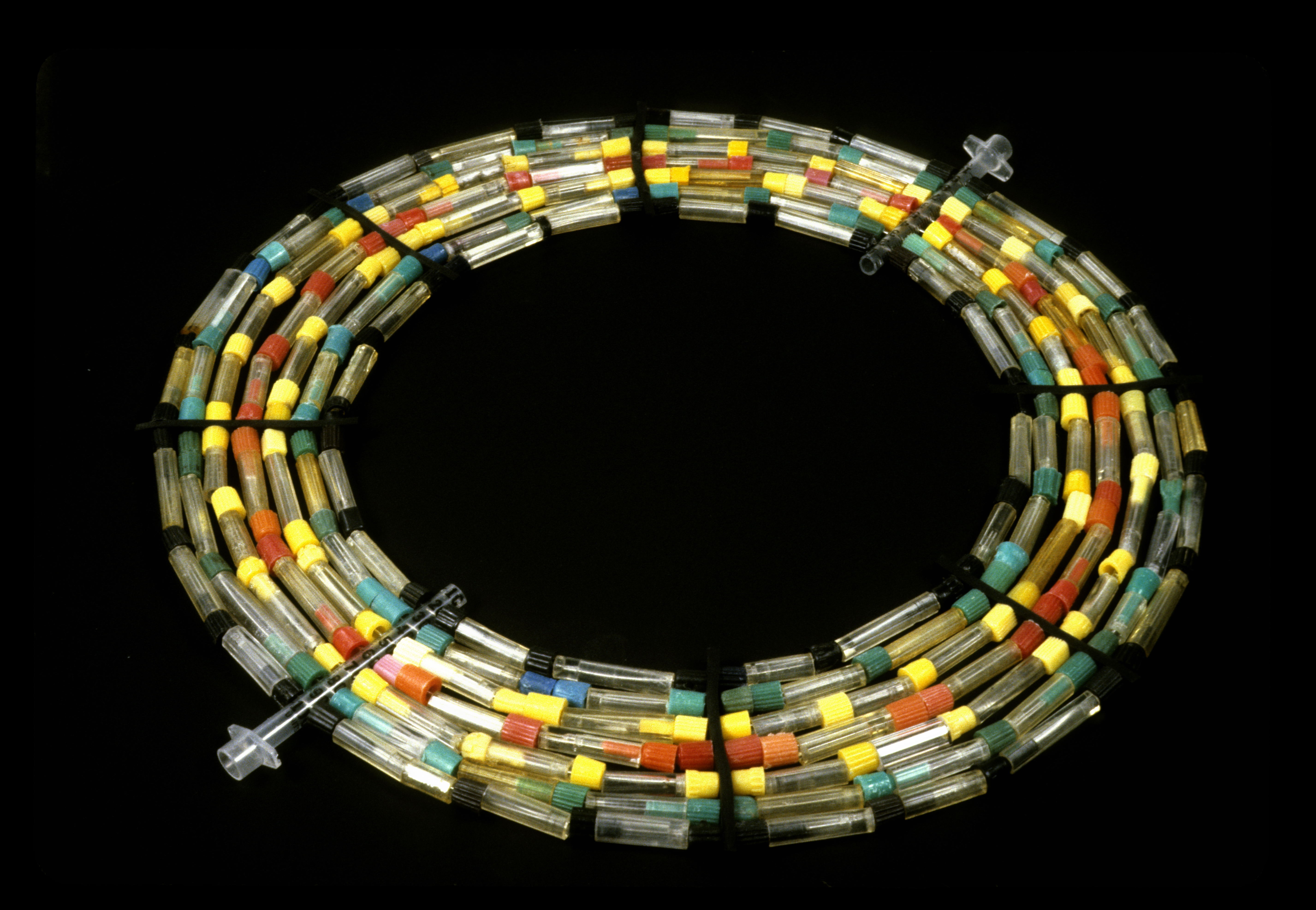
American Collar II, 1999, by Jan Yager

Eventually this ten year exploration grew into the body of work entitled "City Flora/City Flotsam." The materials used for her "City Flotsam" series seem light and ephemeral, though culturally loaded. Brightly colored crack vials and caps suggest the pieces of a child's necklace, but also the trade beads used by seventeenth-century traders and slavers. Yager combines these materials into intricately arranged patterns that pay tribute to Native Americans and enslaved Africans. Underlying each piece is "all the richness that went into its making", the workbench and tools that were used in the process of its formation, the cultural residue of crack vials and other objects that provided inspiration and materials for the work, and its historical and cultural context.

Balancing "the historical continuity of factors such as scale and form on the one hand and the historical discontinuity between materials, techniques and style on the other", Yager creates "thoroughly modern" counterparts of traditional jewelry forms. Through the combination of historical context and materials Yager articulates her feelings of loss and mourning, so it is not surprising that she was also influenced by mourning jewelry. At the same time, the intentional transformation of "degraded materials" into works of art is redemptive and hopeful. Pieces such as Bullet Worry Strand (1995–1999) which incorporates spent bullet casings and American Ruff (2000) which is made from discarded crack vials and caps, are considered exemplars of found-material jewelry. American Ruff is now part of the Philadelphia Museum of Art's permanent collection.

"This work is not for the individual. It's totally about larger issues," she says. "I create authentic art that is of its time and of its place, of my place. I subscribe to the theory that whatever you're looking for, it's right there."

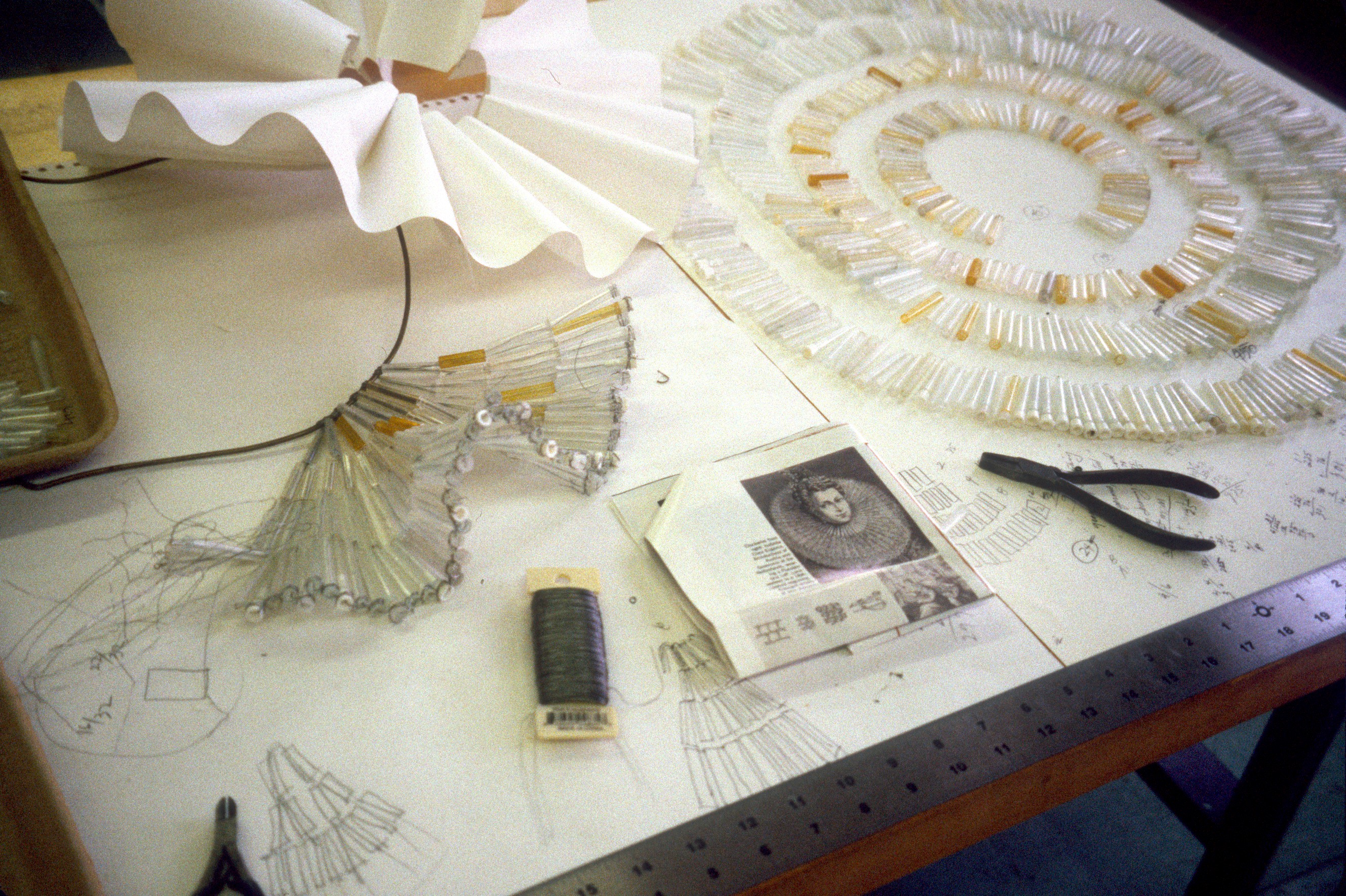
American Ruff – City Flotsam by Jan Yager, as a work in progress

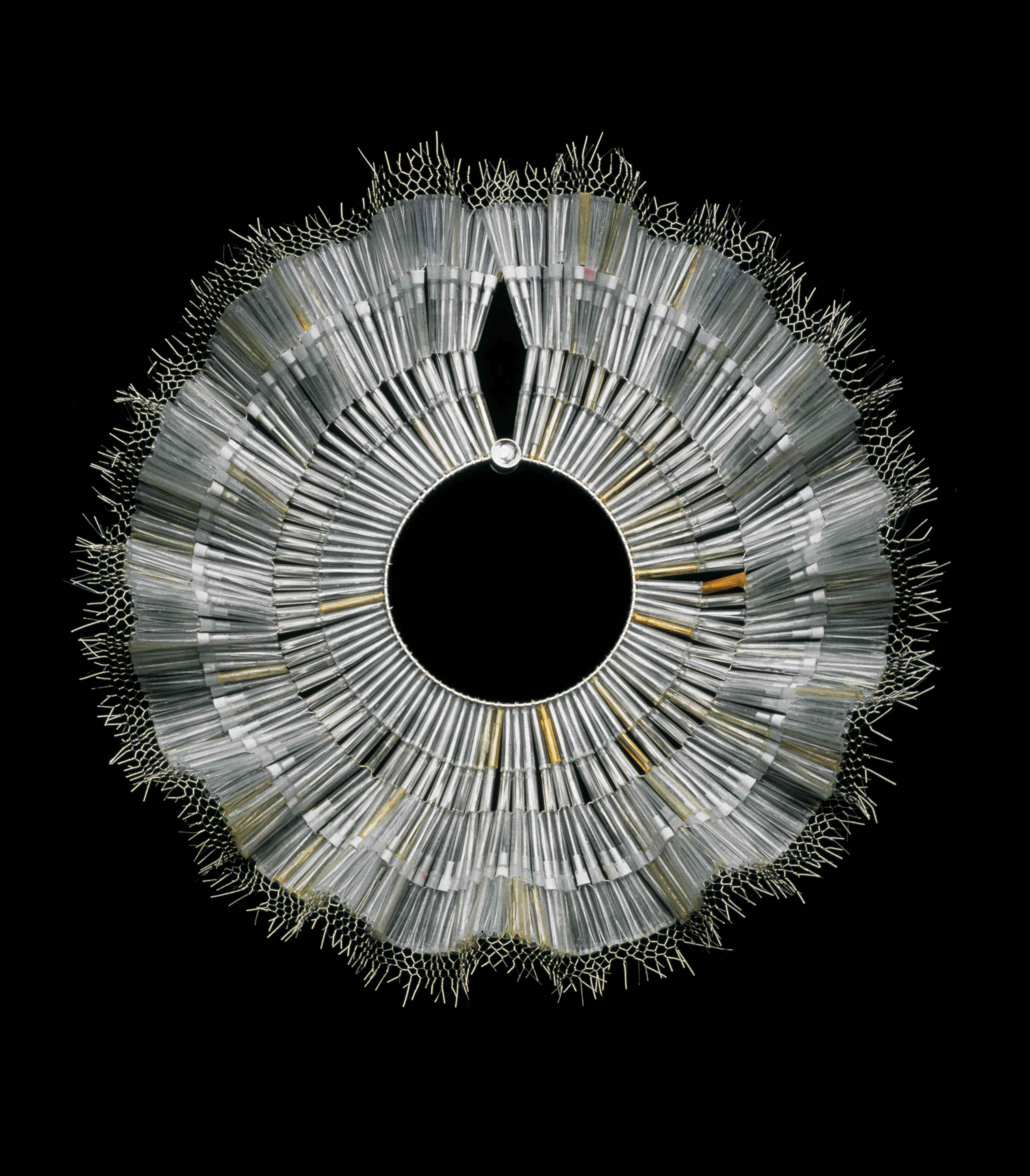
American Ruff – City Flotsam, 2000, by Jan Yager, finished work

=== City Flora ===
In contrast, Yager's "City Flora" pieces recreate in metals the shapes of plants that persist in living even in a dilapidated urban environment. Yager recreates the leaves of plants such as purslane, chicory and dandelion in finely detailed silver and gold. In American Sidewalk Brooch (1999) Yager embodies purslane in blackened sterling silver. The piece has been described as evoking both "glimmers of beauty" and sadness. Pieces such as Dandelion leaf with tire tread texture (1997) have been described as both poignant and serene. The organic forms and enduring materials used in Yager's floral pieces can be seen as providing a necessary balance to the sadness of the "urban stigmata" that she constructs from fragile city flotsam. Together they suggest cycles of decay, death, and renewal.

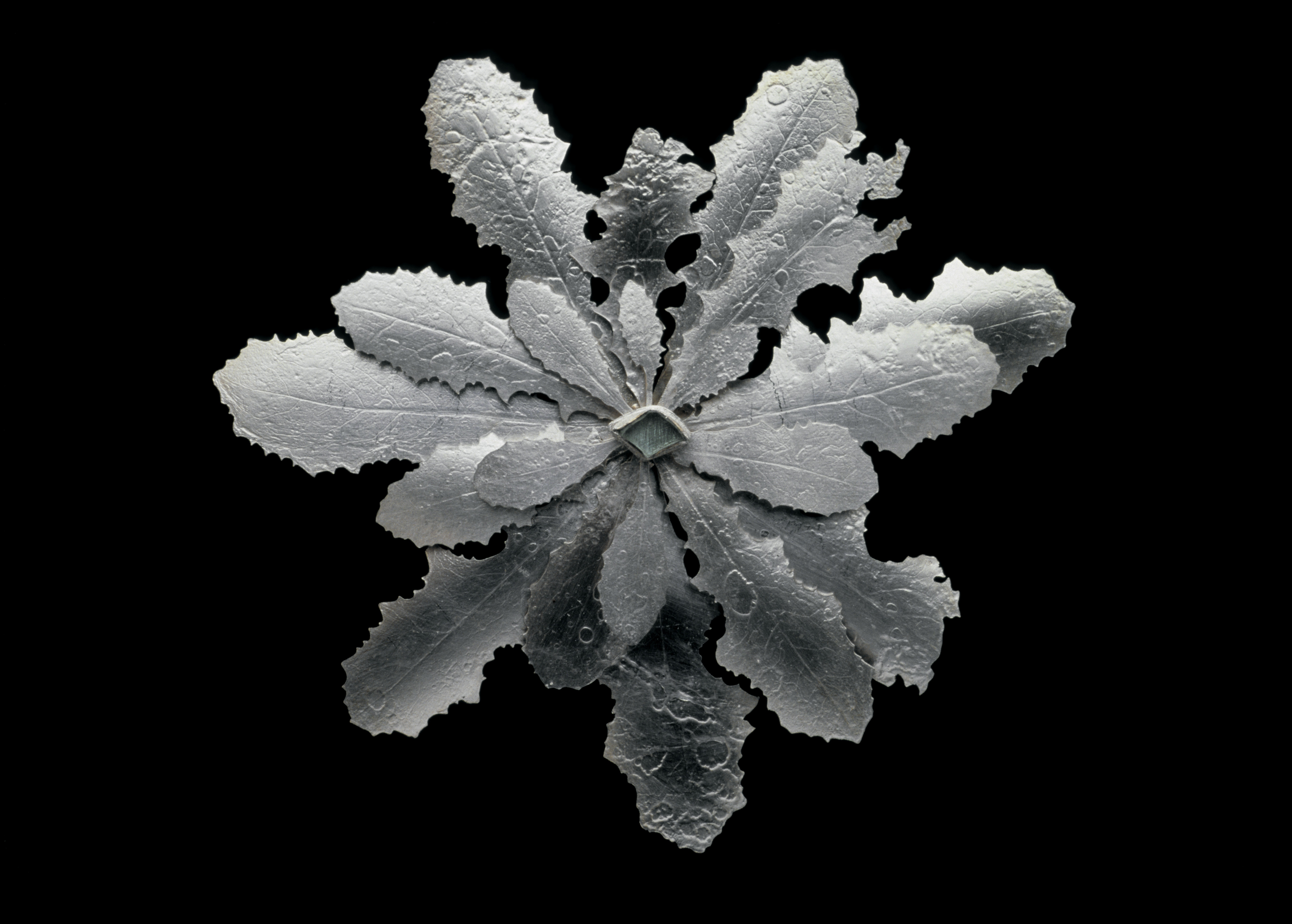
Dandelion Brooch w Auto Glass, 2001, by Jan Yager

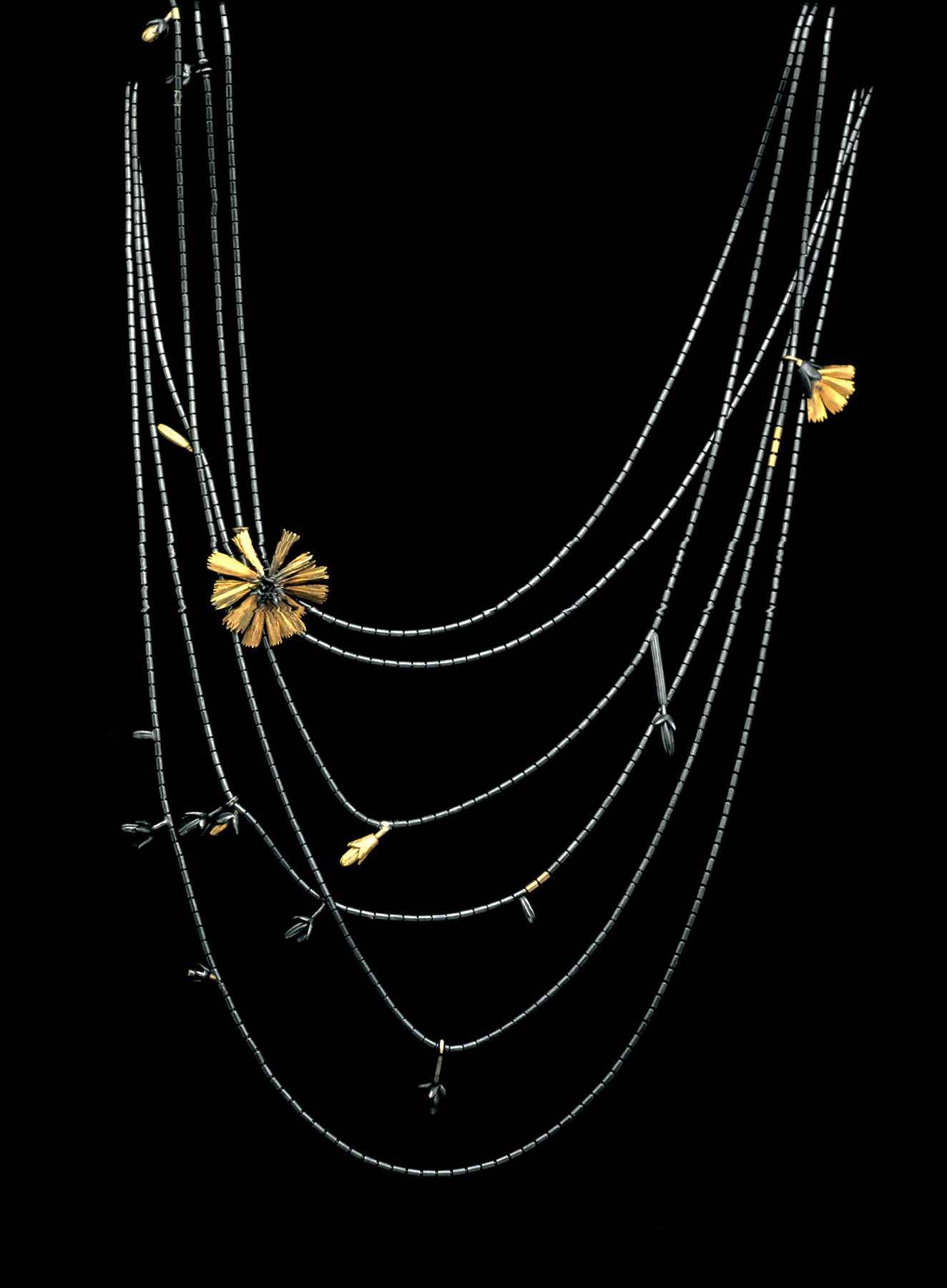
Chicory Strand Necklaces, 2009, by Jan Yager, finished work

=== Tiaras: Useful and Invasive ===
Some of her most elaborate pieces are tiaras. As Yager researched the plants she saw in her neighborhood, she was surprised to find that most of them were not native to the United States. This led her to create American Tiara: Invasive Species (2001), a tangle of urban weeds built from sterling silver and gold. The tiara consists of individual pieces of jewelry that can be worn together or separately. It was part of her solo show at the Victoria and Albert Museum in 2001. The following year, it was included in the major "Tiaras" exhibition at the V&A, among 200 pieces ranging from the 18th century to the present, from punk rock to royalty. It is now part of the Philadelphia Museum of Art's permanent collection.

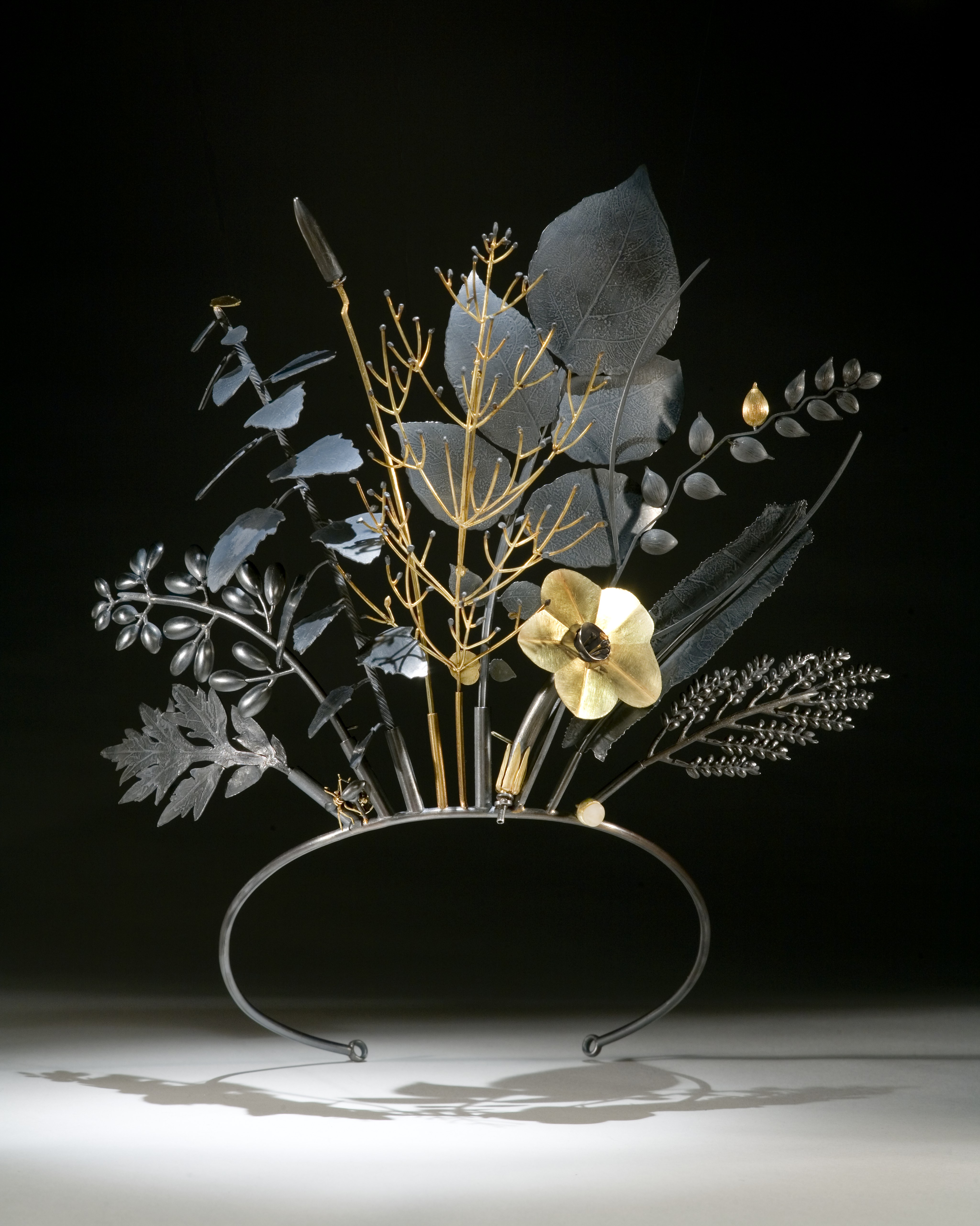
Tiara of Useful Knowledge, 2006, Jan Yager

Yager's Tiara of Useful Knowledge (2006) echoes the purpose of the American Philosophical Society, defined in its charter of 1743 as "Promoting Useful Knowledge". The tiara consists of ten plants, an ant, and a pebble, each of them wearable as separate pieces, as well as together. The plants include ragweed, a potato leaf, clover, crab grass, lamb's quarters and a tobacco blossom. Each plant has its own story of historical and economic significance. The pieces celebrate new world biodiversity at the same time that they raise issues of monoculture, colonial trade and intercultural domination.

Of her interest in history, Yager said "the farther you look back, the farther you can see forward". By invoking historic, artistic and political networks of reference, Yager creates objects of both beauty and an unusual depth of meaning. Her pieces go beyond the "trouvaille", or found object. She herself has described them as "mnemonic devices", reminiscent of Pierre Nora's concept of a "lieu de mémoire" or site of memory.

== The history of artists and objects ==
Yager regarded jewelry as an art form, and attributed its lack of inclusion in art history and art publications, among other reasons, to "plain old sexism".

"The lack of status that we in the jewelry field must contend with is, I believe, deeply entwined with the lack of status of women in our culture. As a result, 'female things,' things like jewelry, and in a broader sense things like art, are diminished in their value... it is my belief we must confront and address these issues in order to understand and go beyond them."

Yager was a member of the American Craft Council and the Society of North American Goldsmiths (SNAG) and served on the advisory board of the Association for the Study of Jewelry and Related Arts (ASJRA). She has written numerous articles for art metal publications, on topics including the work of metalsmith Phillip Fike, the importance of sabbaticals for studio jewelers, and "the powerful and complementary needs of the patron and the artist".

She has been involved in documenting jewelry designers such as Betty Cooke, John Paul Miller and Earl Krentzin by gathering oral histories as part of the Archives of American Art's Nanette L. Laitman Documentation Project for Craft and Decorative Arts in America.

In 2007, Yager was featured in the Peabody Award-winning and Emmy-nominated PBS documentary series "Craft in America: Memory, Landscape, Community", created by executive co-producer Carol Sauvion. The multi-year series was accompanied by the publication of an illustrated book. "Craft in America: Celebrating Two Centuries of Artists and Objects", and a national eight-city touring exhibition, "Craft in America: Expanding Traditions".

== Exhibitions ==
Exhibitions involving Yager's work include:

- 2019: The William and Judith Bollinger Jewellery Gallery, The Victoria and Albert Museum, London, UK
- 2017: "Inspired by Nature", National Museum of Scotland, Edinburgh, Scotland, UK
- 2009–2010: "Wrought and Crafted: Jewelry and Metalwork 1900–Present", Philadelphia Museum of Art, Philadelphia, PA, USA
- 2007: Jewelry by Artists: The Daphne Farago Collection, Museum of Fine Arts, Boston, MA
- 2007: "Craft in America: Expanding Traditions," Group show, national eight-city touring exhibition, companion to the PBS documentary series "Craft in America"
- 2006: Celebrating American Craft: 30 Years of the Philadelphia Museum of Art Craft Show, Philadelphia, Pennsylvania, USA
- 2003: "Jewels & Gems," Renwick Gallery of the Smithsonian American Art Museum, Washington, DC
- 2002: "Tiaras", Victoria and Albert Museum, London, United Kingdom
- 2001: "Jan Yager: City Flora/City Flotsam", Solo show, Victoria and Albert Museum, London, United Kingdom
- 2000: "Beadz! New Work by Contemporary Artists", American Craft Museum, New York, NY
- 1997: "Hello, Again! A New Wave of Recycled Art and Design", Oakland Museum of California, USA, touring group show, curated by Susan Subtle Dintenfass
- 1990: Contemporary Philadelphia Artists: A Juried Exhibition, Philadelphia Museum of Art, Pennsylvania, USA
- 1989: "Craft Today USA", Group show, Musee des Arts Decoratifs, Paris France
- 1989: "Jewelry Design Show", Group show, Indianapolis Museum of Art, Indianapolis, Indiana, USA
- 1984: "Jan Yager", Swan Galleries, Philadelphia, PA, USA
- 1982: "16th International Jewellery Exhibition", Celje Regional Museum, Celje, Yugoslavia

== Awards ==
Yager has received a number of awards including the following:

- 2007: Interdisciplinary Professional Development Grant (IPDG), Philadelphia Center for Arts and Heritage
- 2003: Pew Fellowship in the Arts, Pew Center for Arts & Heritage
- 2003: & 1986 Pennsylvania Council on the Arts fellowships
- 2002: one of three inaugural inductees to the Western Michigan University Art Alumni Academy
- 2001: Anonymous Was A Woman Award, established by Susan Unterberg, for women artists who are over 40 years of age
- 2000: The Peter S. Reed Foundation grant, New York City, New York State, USA
- 2000: Window of Opportunity Grant, The Leeway Foundation, Philadelphia, PA
- 1990: William Penn Foundation Award in 'Contemporary Philadelphia Artists', Philadelphia Museum of Art, Pennsylvania, USA
- 1984: National Endowment for the Arts Fellowship, United States Federal Government
- 1985: Michael Bondanza Prize for Excellence in Jewelry Design
- 1982: Rhode Island State Council on the Arts, Grant-in-Aid: for Crafts,
- 1982: Elected: Distinguished Member, Society of North American Goldsmiths,
- 1982: Classic Jewelry, Merit Award, World Gold Council, New York, NY.
