= Margaret Merwin Patch =

- Born: Margaret Stone Merwin; January 26, 1894; Bloomington, Illinois, U.S.
- Died: March 19, 1987 (aged 93); Shelburne Falls, Massachusetts, U.S.
- Other name: Margaret Stone Merwin Patch
- Occupations: Arts administrator, statistician
- Spouse: George William Patch (m. 1930–1950)

Margaret Merwin Patch (née Margaret Stone Merwin; January 26, 1894 – March 19, 1987) was an American arts administrator, and statistician. She was a co-founder of the World Crafts Council, and was the founder of Merwin-Davis Statistical Reports and Charts (1894–1987), a statistical graphic design company. Patch was a Fellow of the American Craft Council in 1975.

== Publications ==
- "The Craftsman". The Journal of Modern Craft. 5 (1): 103–107. 1 March 2012. doi:10.2752/174967812X13287914145631. ISSN 1749-6772.
