= Daphne Farago =

- Born: March 8, 1924; Johannesburg, South Africa
- Died: July 23, 2017 (aged 93); Delray Beach, Florida
- Occupations: Art collector and philanthropist

Daphne Farago (March 8, 1924, in Johannesburg, South Africa – July 23, 2017, in Delray Beach, Florida) was an art collector and philanthropist.

Her particular areas of interest were American folk art and furniture and contemporary craft objects, furniture, and jewelry. In those areas she collected widely. Farago was known for identifying significant artists early in their careers. Art News Magazine included her among the 100 top collectors in the world. Her donations of artworks to the Rhode Island School of Design (RISD) and the Museum of Fine Arts, Boston were extensive and considered transformative.

== Biography ==
Daphne Arcus was born March 8, 1924, in Johannesburg, South Africa, to Hyman and Rachel (née Berkowitch) Arcus.

After World War II, Daphne Arcus was active in Europe to aid in relief work with displaced persons in Europe. She met her future husband Peter Farago in Munich where she was working with the Red Cross. He too was working in the relief effort.

Peter Farago was born on March 31, 1922, in Oradea, Romania to Aladar Farago and Margaret Berger. Many of his family was murdered during the Holocaust. Peter escaped from a Nazi forced labor camp in the Carpathian Mountains after 1.5 years imprisonment. Speaking five languages, he was particularly useful to the U.S. Military and other agencies involved in relief work.

In 1948 Peter entered the United States, debarking from a military ship at Brooklyn, New York. He attended Rhode Island School of Design (RISD), earning a B. S. degree in textile engineering in 1952. In 1954 he started a successful business, the New England Printed Tape Co., in Pawtucket, Rhode Island. NEPTCO produced tape and later coated films and substrates for the insulation of wires and cables.

Daphne emigrated to Montreal, Canada and then to the United States in 1950. In 1951, Daphne married Peter Farago. They lived in Providence, Rhode Island, summering in Little Compton near the Sakonnet River and Narragansett Bay. Other areas where they lived include Marathon, Key West, and Key Biscayne in Florida. The Faragos had three sons, Alan, Paul and Robert.

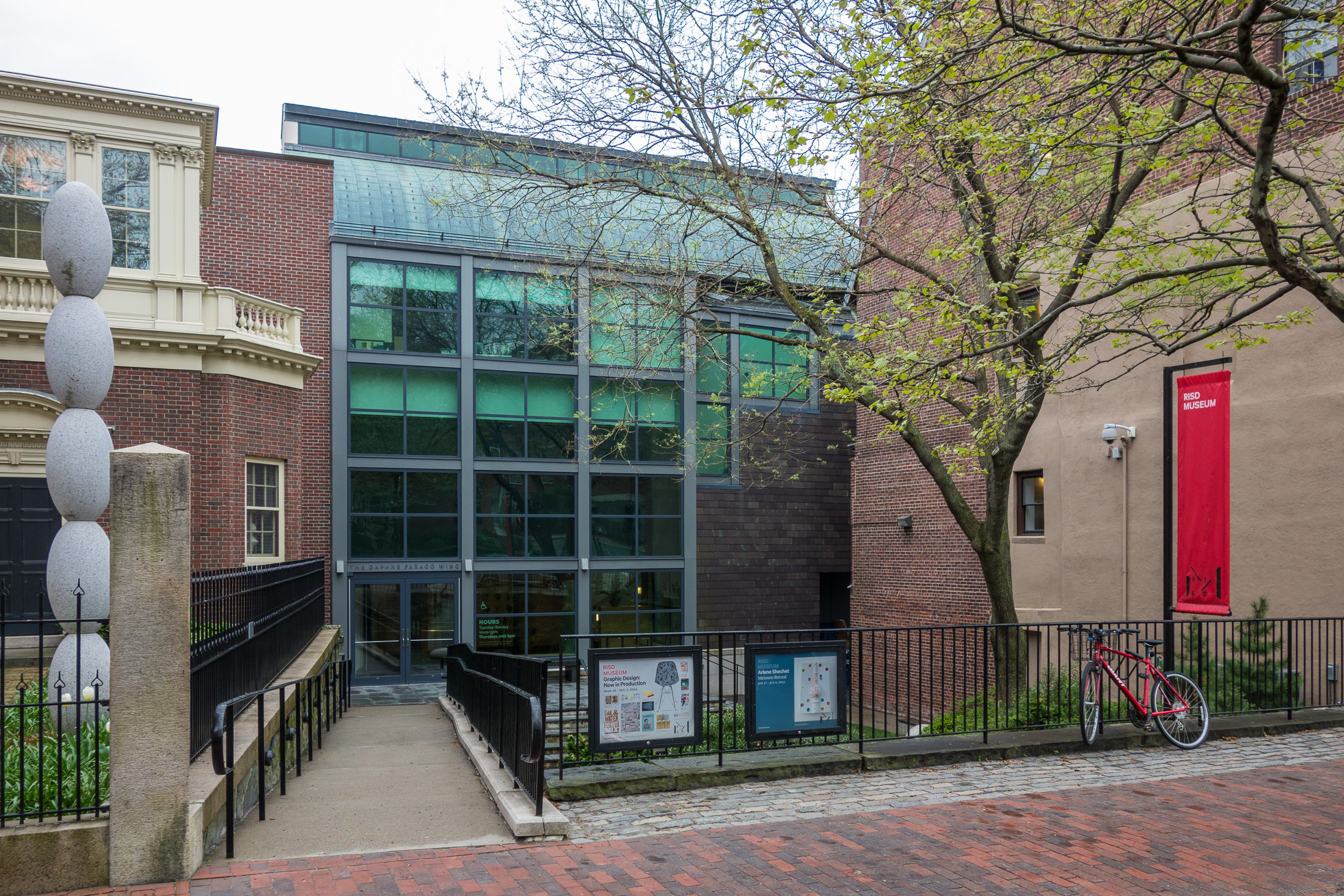
Daphne Farago Wing, RISD Museum of Art

Daphne became a docent at the RISD Museum of Art. A self-taught collector, she became highly regarded for her work with American folk art and furniture in the 1960s and 1970s. This collection was donated and many of the pieces auctioned off in 1991 to benefit the RISD Museum of Art. In 1993, the RISD Museum of Art created an exhibition center named the Daphne Farago Wing in her honor.

Next, Farago focused on contemporary studio craft works, collecting glass, ceramics, wooden objects and furniture in addition to fiber art and jewelry. She became known for her "discerning eye" and her ability to identify emerging artists who would become leaders in their fields. For her, part of the appeal of collecting was the opportunity for involvement and interaction with the artists, to directly show her respect for them and their work.

She collected with the intent of acquiring work that encompassed the span of an artist's career, finding pieces that showed an artist's capabilities and unique style.

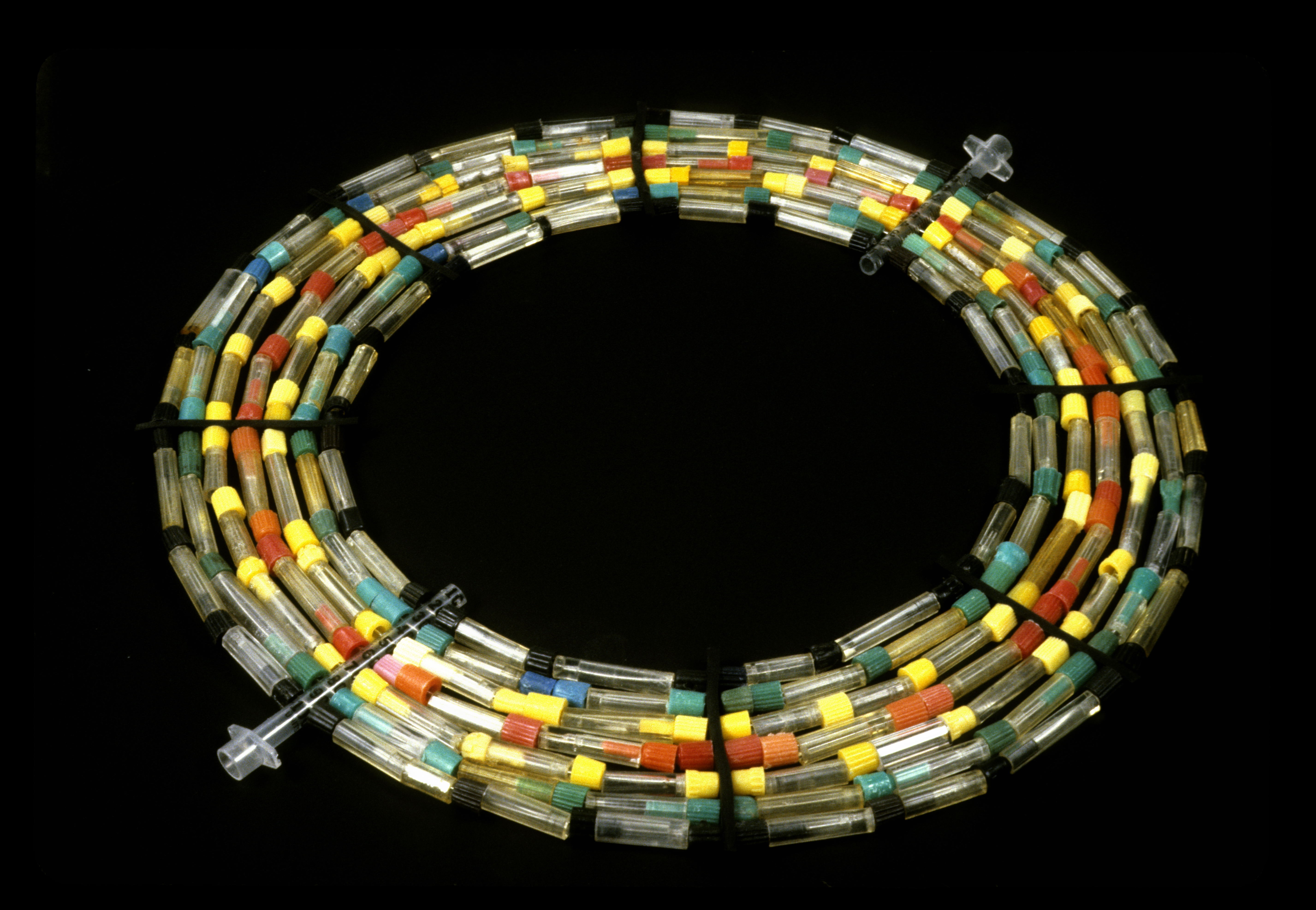
American Collar II, 1999, by Jan Yager

She regarded jewelry as a form of public art, to be worn. In her jewelry collection she focused on the twentieth century from 1940 onwards, first collecting American jewelry and later adding European works. Farago liked to collect wearable jewelry, but also bought some pieces which were more provocative, such as Jan Yager's American Collar II. Artists whose works she collected include Robert Ebendorf, Mary Lee Hu, Sam Kramer, Bruce Metcalf, and Art Smith.

She was an early supporter of artists such as glass sculptors Dale Chihuly and Michael Glancy; ceramic sculptor Kenneth Price; wood sculptors and furniture builders Sam Maloof, John Cederquist, and Wendell Castle; and sculptors Louis Mueller and Claus Bury. She also collected works by fiber and textile artists such as Anni Albers, Sheila Hicks, Kate Anderson, Jeannette Marie Ahlgren, Dominic Di Mare, Lenore Tawney and Kay Sekimachi.

Many of the objects have simple forms (spheres and fruitlike shapes are favorites) and bold colors, reflect sensitive and intelligent handling of materials and convey the individuality, imagination and, at times, sense of humor of their makers.

Farago also made significant donations of works to the Museum of Fine Arts, Boston (MFA), donations whose impact was transformative. Over her lifetime, she donated nearly 1000 objects to the Museum, including over 80 works of contemporary fiber art by Ed Rossbach and Katherine Westphal (2004) and over 650 pieces of contemporary jewelry (2006). The Daphne and Peter Farago Gallery at the Museum was opened in 2011. Her collection of jewelry became the basis for the exhibition Jewelry by Artists: The Daphne Farago Collection which was held at the MFA in 2007, and the reference work Jewelry By Artists in the Studio 1940-2000, published by the MFA. Farago also supported the yearly Farago Lecture on Jewelry at the MFA which focused on art jewelry.

Peter Farago died on February 21, 2010. In 2012, Daphne Farago gave the MFA its largest gift of contemporary craft art to date, 161 craft objects made of fiber, ceramics, glass, wood, metal, and basketry. The gift was unrestricted. The Faragos are identified as "Great Benefactors" for making gifts of the value of $2.5 million-$5 million to the museum.

"I think her passion and her vision was really unparalleled... She's been transformative in what we're able to do as an institution, to make craft have a presence at the museum, and to engage people." Emily Zilber, curator at the Museum of Fine Arts, Boston.
