= Katherine Westphal =

American textile artist (1919–2018)

- Born: January 2, 1919 2 January 1919; Los Angeles, California
- Died: March 13, 2018 (aged 99); Berkeley, California
- Known for: Fiber art
- Spouse: Ed Rossbach

Katherine Westphal (January 2, 1919 – March 13, 2018) was an American textile designer and fiber artist who helped to establish quilting as a fine art form.

== Early life and education ==
Westphal was born January 2, 1919, in Los Angeles, California to Emma and Leo Westphal, who managed grocery stores. At age two, she began cutting, pasting and coloring and decided that she liked to do that more than anything. She attended Los Angeles public, elementary, junior and senior high schools. In 1941 she earned an Associate of Arts degree from Los Angeles City College. She then transferred to the University of California, Berkeley, where she studied painting and art history and received BA and MFA degrees in painting. In 1943 she was awarded the Phelan Traveling Scholarship for Practicing Artists, established by James D. Phelan, former U. S. Senator from California. The scholarship provided funds for travel to Mexico, where she visited the studios of muralists David Alfaro Siqueiros and Diego Rivera.

== Academic career ==
In 1945 Westphal accepted a one-year teaching position at the University of Wyoming, Laramie, where she discovered that she was expected to teach art in grades one through twelve, rather than supervising practice teachers and teaching art at the college level. She complained to the university authorities, exchanged classes with other faculty members, and created her own course outlines. Standing up for herself and protesting when situations were not to her liking became a characteristic attribute of her academic career. She moved to Seattle, Washington in 1946 to teach two-dimensional design and drawing in the Art Department at the University of Washington. While there she met Ed Rossbach, one of the 20th century's most important teacher of textiles. They married in 1950 and moved to Berkeley, where Rossbach had accepted a teaching position at the University of California. Westphal could not be hired at the university because of nepotism rules. She began a new career in textile printing and sold her fabric designs for the next eight years. When her agent, Frederick Karoly, retired and returned her unsold design samples, Westphal cut them up and sewed them back together, collage-style, to make "art to wear" and art quilts. Her quilts were shown at Museum West in San Francisco and the Museum of Contemporary Craft in New York. Two of the quilts are now in the Renwick Gallery, in the Smithsonian American Art Museum in Washington, DC. In 1966 she agreed to teach a design class for one quarter at the University of California, Davis. She stayed, became a tenured faculty member in 1968, and turned a design appreciation class that no one wanted, into one enrolling 300 students each term, with ten assistants working with her. She became a full professor in 1975 and retired in 1979, honored as Professor Emeritus.

== Fiber artist ==
"Almost everything I do is related to where I've been or where I'm going to go. Basically, I'm a tourist, moving around the world to faraway places either by actually traveling to the spot or by using the armchair method. Then it all pops out in my work - someone else's culture and mine, mixed in the eggbeater of my mind to create a reality for me and a better understanding of what I have seen or experienced. Much of my work is autobiographical, a record of images observed and treasured".

The crafts revival of the 1960s led Westphal to incorporate quilting into her artwork. As a trained painter, she brought appreciation for a traditionally female craft to an accepted medium of expression in contemporary art. Her quilted wall hangings are examples of invention found in traditional techniques. She combined applique, stitchery, batik, tapestry and quilting to create new forms, building up section by section, to create a new order. She manipulated images with the photocopier, making identical images; then combining them, layering them, and integrating the whole assemblage into one textile before hand-quilting the whole. Her 1967 quilt, "A Square is a Many Splendored Thing," was included in the 1969 Objects: USA traveling exhibition and earned a full page color illustration in the 1970 exhibition catalog. Another quilt, "Puzzle of the Floating World," made in 1975, was included in the 1976 New American Quilt exhibition in New York, the first exhibition to feature contemporary quilts exclusively.

Westphal influenced a generation of textile artists. Her work includes painting, textiles designed for industry, art textiles for the wall, baskets, books, and clothing. She became a pioneer in pursuing new avenues of textile printing and image generation - including the use of the office Xerox copy machine, and heat transfer on both cloth and handmade paper. She was recognized as a "permission-giver," one who showed that nothing was off limits, including feminist revaluation of "women's work," and escape from textile traditions of precision and order.

In 1979 Westphal was elected to the American Craft Council College of Fellows, an award given to "honor those who have made an outstanding contribution to the crafts in America." She received the 2009 Gold Medal for Consummate Craftsmanship from the American Craft Council. Artists selected for this honor must have demonstrated extraordinary artistic ability and must have worked for 25 years or more in the discipline for which they are recognized.

Westphal died in March 2018 at the age of 99. Her work is in the Smithsonian American Art Museum.

== Publications ==
- Westphal, Katherine (1979). Dragons and Other Creatures: Chinese Embroideries of the Ch'ing Dynasty. Berkeley, California: Lancaster-Miller Publishers.
- Westphal, Katherine (1993). The Surface Designer's Art: Contemporary Fabric Printers, Painters, and Dyers. Asheville, N.C., U.S.A: Lark Books.
