= Eszter Haraszty =

American textile artist

- Born: Edith Herczka; September 28, 1920; Miskolc, Hungary
- Died: November 30, 1994 (aged 74); Los Angeles
- Education: Hungarian University of Fine Arts
- Known for: Graphic design, Textiles

Eszter Haraszty (1920– 24 November 1994) was a Hungarian-born designer best known for her work as head of the textiles department at Knoll.

== Career ==
Eszter Haraszty was born on September 28, 1920 in Hungary as Edith Herczka and received her education from the Hungarian University of Fine Arts in Budapest. After graduation, she worked as a costume designer before moving to the U.S. in 1946, where she moved into textile design.

She was living with the Breuers when Hans Knoll saw her portfolio. He hired her as a textiles designer at his company, Knoll, where she began working under Marianne Strengell. In 1949, Haraszty was appointed director of KnollTextiles (the Knoll textiles department), a position she held until 1955. Knoll's look in the 1950s and 60s can be attributed to Haraszty who reissued older prints in bolder colorwaves, including its ubiquitous red-orange color, revolutionizing commercial upholstery fabrics and textures. Her designs were often floral and is best known for her Iceland poppy motif. Under Haraszty, KnollTextiles explored then-novel fabrics, such as nylon, mixing them with other materials.

In 1958, she opened her own studio in New York and consulted at Victor Gruen Associates and IBM, as well as designing a line of women's clothing for B.H. Wragge. She also designed restaurant interiors at Expo 58 in Brussels and a children's playground for American President Lines. As a lecturer at UCLA, Haraszty taught a course called "Design From Nature."

Over the course of her career, Haraszty was awarded five gold medals from the Association of Interior Designers for her textile designs, as well as an award from the Pasadena Art Museum. Many of her prints and textile samples are now part of museum collections, including the Art Institute of Chicago, the Metropolitan Museum of Art, the Minneapolis Institute of Art, the Museum of Modern Art, Cooper Hewitt, Smithsonian Design Museum, the Victoria and Albert Museum, and the Château Dufresne.

Haraszty later moved to California where her work incorporated embroidery and crewel to create what she called "needlepainting." She wrote books on the subject and created needlepainting kits for production.

== Personal life and death ==
Haraszty quit Knoll to move to Coldwater Canyon, where she and her husband renovated a house in her signature bright colors and florals.

Haraszty died on 24 November 1994 of non-Hodgkin's lymphoma.

== Books ==
- Needlepainting : a garden of stitches, Eszter Haraszty, Bruce David Colen. 1974
- The Embroiderer's Portfolio of Flower Designs, Eszter Haraszty. 1981
