= Ed Rossbach =

American fiber artist (1914–2002)

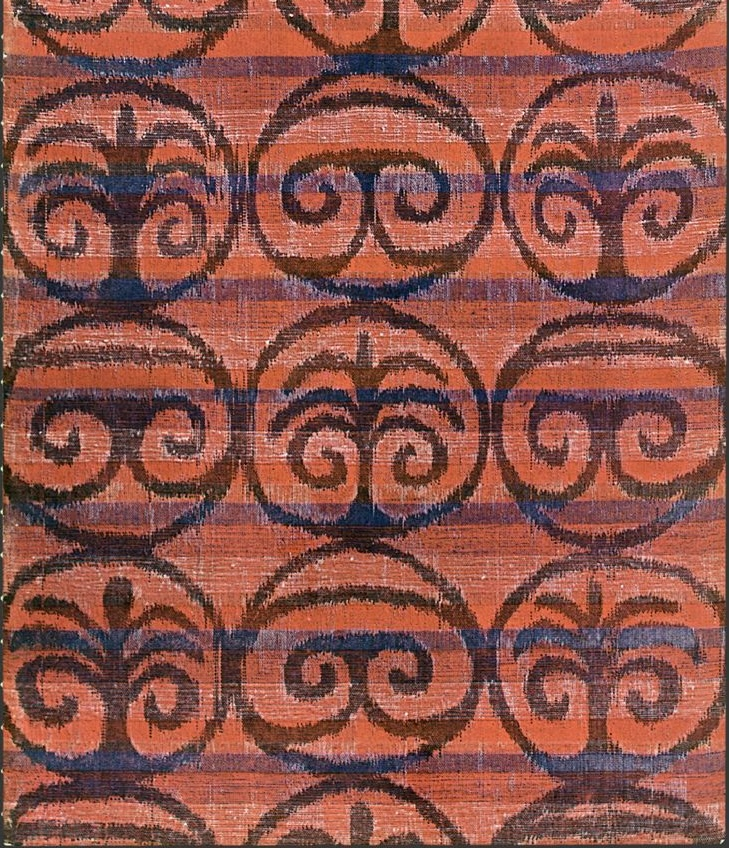
Experimental fabric designed and woven, using Ikat technique, ca. 1961

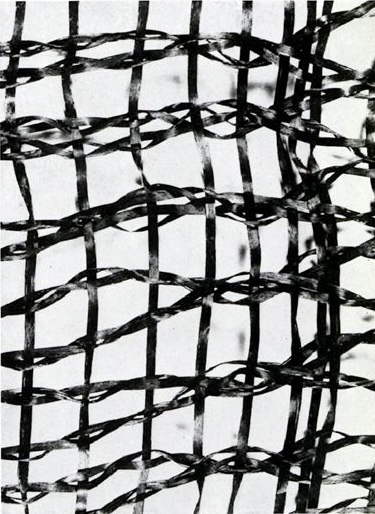
Detail of experimental gauze woven of black cellulose ribbons, ca. 1961

'Happy Days', poplar wood, paper and watercolor sculpture, 1991, Metropolitan Museum of Art

Ed Rossbach (Chicago, 1914 – Berkeley, California, October 7, 2002) was an American fiber artist. His career began with ceramics and weaving in the 1940s, but evolved over the next decade into basket making, as he experimented playfully with traditional techniques and nontraditional materials such as plastic and newspaper.

== Education ==
Rossbach earned a BA in Painting and Design at the University of Washington in Seattle, Washington in 1940, an MA in art education from Columbia University in New York City in 1941, and an MFA in ceramics and weaving from the Cranbrook Academy of Art in Bloomfield Hills, Michigan in 1947.

== Career ==
Rossbach taught at Puyallup Jr. High School in Puyallup, Washington from 1941 to 1942 before enlisting in the U.S. Army Signal Corps, Alaska Communication System, from 1942 to 1945. After World War II, he taught at the University of Washington School of Art, in Seattle, Washington from 1947 to 1950, and at the University of California, Berkeley from 1950 to 1979.

In 1950 Rossbach married Katherine Westphal, a textile designer, and creator of art quilts and wearable art. Whereas Rossbach felt himself "temperamentally unsuited" to industrial designing, Westphall created commercial textiles during the 1950s. Both were influential teachers and designers who helped to create a transition from mid-century modernism and its emphasis on the functionality of textiles, to nonfunctional fiber art. They saw themselves as artists working in fiber.

Rossbach explored the possibilities of fiber as a material, both on an off the loom. He was strongly influenced by ethnic textiles, including basketry, and often combined ethnic techniques with contemporary materials such as plastic and newspaper. His explorations of three-dimensional forms and basketry as an art form challenged the accepted boundaries of what could be done with craft materials and led to him being considered the "father of contemporary baskets". He has been described as "transforming the ordinary into the extraordinary".

Throughout his career, Rossbach was active in writing and lecturing, publishing books such as Baskets as Textile Art (1973), The New Basketry (1976), The Nature of Basketry (1986), and The Art of Paisley (1980). He wrote about craft and craft artists for the magazines Craft Horizons and American Craft, and was recognized as an honorary Fellow and a gold medalist of the American Craft Council.

Rossbach's works are included in the collections of museums such as The Metropolitan Museum of Art, the Museum of Modern Art, The Art Institute of Chicago, the Smithsonian American Art Museum, the Rhode Island School of Design Museum, and the Cranbrook Academy of Art. Retrospectives of his work have included Ed Rossbach: 40 Years of Exploration and Innovation in Fiber Art (1990) and Ties that bind: Fiber art by Ed Rossbach and Katherine Westphal from the Daphne Farago collection (1997).

Rossbach died at age 88 after a prolonged illness on October 7, 2002.

== Publications ==
- Halper, Vicki; Rossbach, Ed (1991). John McQueen: the language of containment; essays by Vicki Halper and Ed Rossbach. Washington, D.C.: Renwick Gallery, National Museum of American Art, Smithsonian Institution. ISBN 9780295971537. OCLC 23868662.
- Rossbach, Ed; Stevens, Rebecca A. T.; Brite, Jane Fassett (1990). Ed Rossbach: 40 years of exploration and innovation in fiber art. Asheville, N.C: Lark Books. ISBN 9780937274521. OCLC 645335738 – via Internet Archive.
- Rossbach, Ed (1986). The nature of basketry. West Chester, Pa: Schiffer Pub. ISBN 9780887400599. OCLC 551321569 – via Internet Archive.
- Rossbach, Ed (1980). The art of Paisley. New York: Van Nostrand Reinhold Co. ISBN 9780442243463. OCLC 5830519.
- Rossbach, Ed (1976). The new basketry. New York: Van Nostrand Reinhold. ISBN 9780442270551. OCLC 1150823467 – via Internet Archive.
- Rossbach, Ed (1973). Baskets as textile art. New York: Van Nostrand Reinhold Co. ISBN 9780442270490. OCLC 576313444 – via Internet Archive.
