= Rose Slivka =

American magazine editor

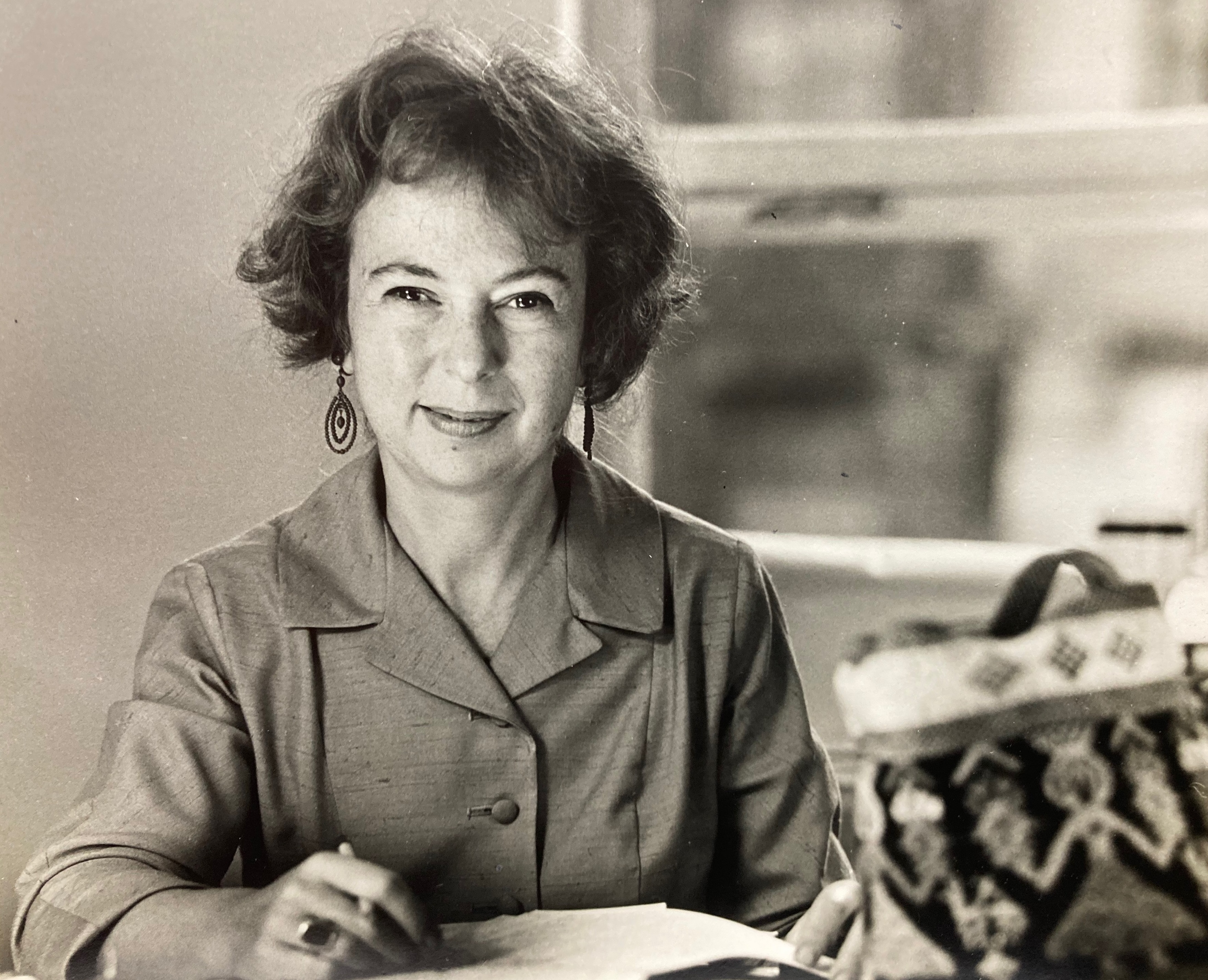
- Slivka at her desk at Craft Horizons Magazine
- Born: January 9, 1919; New York City, NY
- Died: September 2, 2004 (aged 85); Southampton, NY
- Occupation: Editor-in-chief of Craft Horizons

Rose Slivka (January 9, 1919 – September 2, 2004) was an American poet and writer for women's magazines in the twentieth century. From 1959 to 1979 she was the editor-in-chief for Craft Horizons (now American Craft Magazine). Her 1978 book on the artist Peter Voulkos is considered the first contemporary craft monograph.

Born in New York City on January 9, 1919, Slivka obtained her degree in English from Hunter College in 1941. In 1979 she was named an honorary fellow of the American Craft Council. She died on September 2, 2004 in Southampton, New York.

== Work on Craft Horizons ==
Slivka is notable for shifting Craft Horizons magazine away from technical articles towards more professional and critical writing that included contributions from many outside the field. While serving as editor-in-chief at Craft Horizons, Slivka published The New Ceramic Presence in 1961, which the American Craft Council called "groundbreaking."
