= Michael Glancy =

American glass and sculpture artist and arts educator

'Melding Impetus', glass, copper and gold sculpture by Michael Glancy, 1994, Metropolitan Museum of Art

Michael M. Glancy (February 11, 1950 – August 29, 2020) was an American glass and sculpture artist and arts educator.

== Biography ==
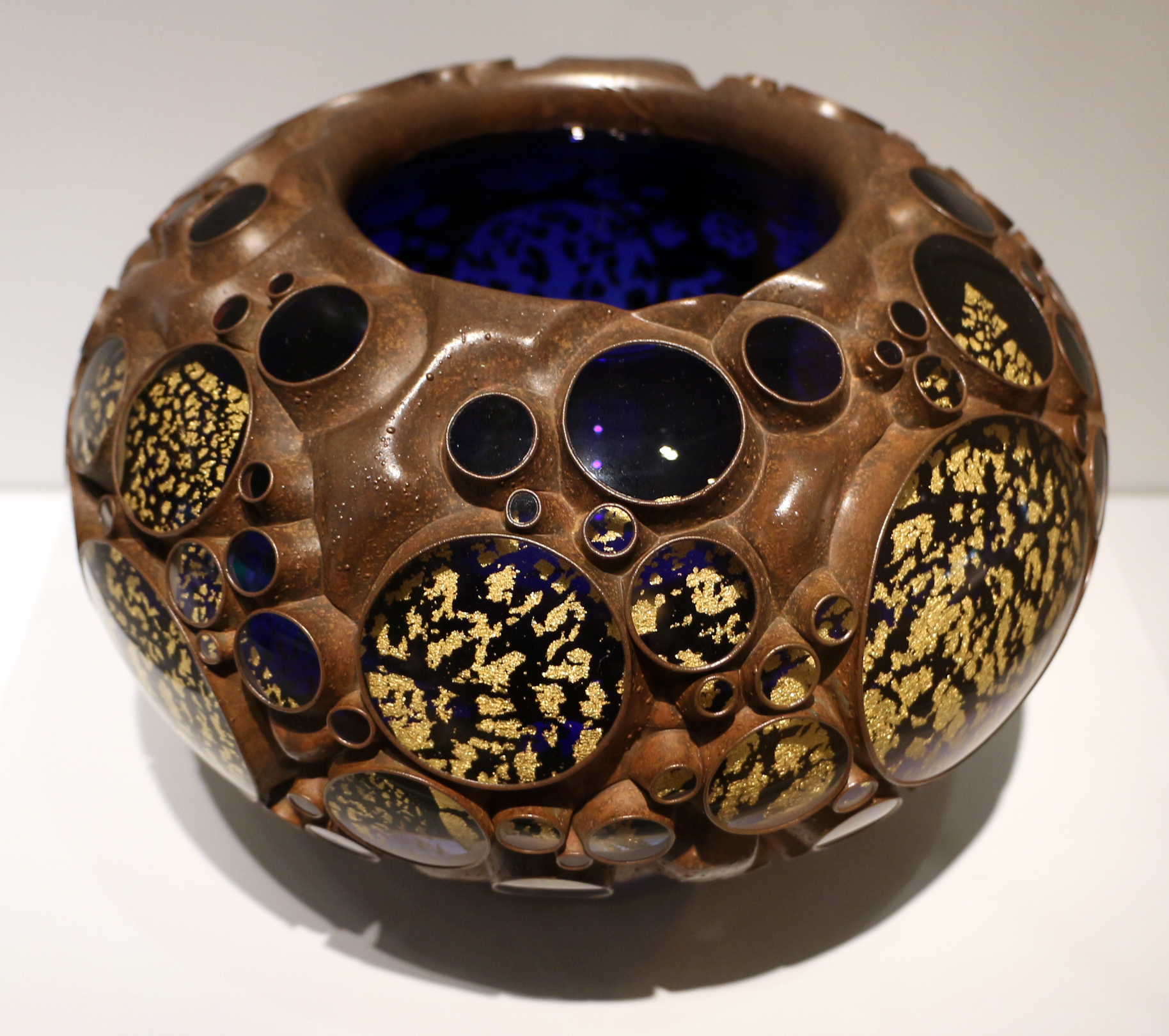
Ur Crustacean vase, 1990-91

Glancy was born in Detroit, Michigan in 1950. He began working with glass in 1970 and received a BFA from the University of Denver in 1973. In 1977 he earned a second BFA in sculpture from the Rhode Island School of Design. Glancy earned an MFA in glass from the Rhode Island School of Design in 1980, where he studied with Dale Chihuly.

Glancy was a member of the adjunct Faculty and a Senior Critic in the Jewelry & Metalsmithing Department at the Rhode Island School of Design from 1982 until his death in 2020, where he taught the technique of electroforming. He also served regularly as invited Faculty at the Pilchuck Glass School in Stanwood, Washington.

Glancy worked for over 20 years with Attleboro, Massachusetts colleague Myles Baer. Baer assisted with cold working techniques including engraving and sandblasting of both the glass vessels and their base plates. In addition to working with glass, Baer is also a musician and songwriter. Glancy also collaborated with Adrianne Evans, who assisted with wax mold making for casting glass and metal objects. Past studio assistants of Glancy include fellow American glass artist, Daniel Clayman.

In 2003 Glancy was included in the exhibition "Fire and Form," curated by William Warmus for the Norton Museum of Art in West Palm Beach. In the book accompanying the show, Warmus wrote: "Michael Glancy magnifies nature in order to reveal its underlying structure...the flat glass panels that form sculptural bases for his artworks...unfold into and inspire the vessels that sit astride them."

Glancy died on August 29, 2020, at his summer home in Harwich Port, Massachusetts while suffering from lung cancer. He was 70 years old.

== Collections ==
His work was acquired for the exhibit One of a Kind: The Studio Craft Movement at the Metropolitan Museum of Art in New York City, on display in 2006 – 2007. In 2013, five of his works were included in the Corning Museum of Glass permanent collection. In 2012 his work was included in the Minneapolis Institute of Art museum permanent collection. His works can be found in the collections of the Carnegie Museum of Art, Detroit Institute of Arts, The Metropolitan Museum of Art, Museum of Fine Arts, Houston; Smithsonian American Art Museum, the Renwick Gallery, Glasmuseum, Ebeltoft, Denmark; Musée des Arts décoratifs, Paris; Museum of Contemporary Art, Hokkaido, Japan; and the Victoria and Albert Museum, London, among others. Glancy's glass and metal sculpture can be found in museum, public and private collections, worldwide.

== Publications ==
- Glancy, Michael, "Michael Glancy - Infinite Obsessions", Arnoldsche Art Publishers, Stuttgart, Germany 2011.
- Glancy, Michael, Michael Glancy, Switzerland, Galerie Von Bartha, 2001.
- Glancy, Michael, Beyond Vessels: Recent Glass Work by Michael Glancy, New York, Barry Friedman, 1997.
- Glancy, Michael, Constellations an Alternative Galaxy Glass By Michael Glancy, Basel, Switzerland, Von Bartha, 1995.
