= Śliwka =

Śliwka is a Polish surname meaning "plum". Notable people include:

- Aleksander Śliwka (born 1995), Polish volleyball player
- Karol Śliwka (1894–1943), Polish communist politician
- Maria Śliwka (1935–1997), Polish volleyball player
