= Aileen Osborn Webb =

American patron of crafts (1892–1979)

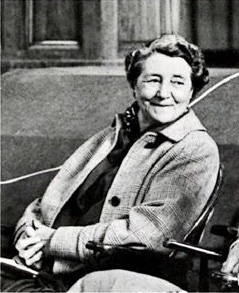
- Born: Aileen Osborn; 1892; Garrison, New York, U.S.
- Died: August 15, 1979 (aged 86–87); Garrison, New York, U.S.
- Occupation: Arts patron
- Known for: Founded the American Craftsmen's Educational Council (now the American Craft Council)
- Spouse: Vanderbilt Webb
- Children: 4
- Parents: William Church Osborn. (father); Alice Clinton Hoadley Dodge. (mother)
- Relatives: Frederick Osborn (brother)

Aileen Osborn Webb (1892–1979) was an American patron of crafts. She was a founder of the organization now known as the American Craft Council, which gives an annual award named for her. She was considered a "principal supporter" of the American Craft movement during the Great Depression. She founded the School for American Craftsmen (SAC), which is now part of Rochester Institute of Technology (RIT).

== Early life ==
Aileen Osborn was born on June 25, 1892 in Garrison, New York to William Church Osborn, an art collector who later donated his art pieces to the Metropolitan Museum of Art and active member of the Democratic Party, and Alice Clinton Hoadley Dodge, a philanthropist, social reformer and daughter of William E. Dodge Jr. Her brother was Frederick Osborn. She was educated at Miss Chapin's School in New York City and then in Paris, where she learned to speak French.

At the age of 20, Aileen married Vanderbilt Webb, son of Eliza Osgood Vanderbilt Webb, grandson of William Henry Vanderbilt and great-grandson of Cornelius Vanderbilt. The couple got married on September 10, 1912, in Garrison. They had three boys and one girl: Derrick, William, Richard, and Barbara.

== Family influence ==
Webb had deep knowledge of art and education. The men in Aileen Osborn Webb's family had a lot of influence on her, as they set the bar extremely high with humanitarian and civil contribution; their lives were "full of good works".

Her father, William Church Osborn, was the director of the Metropolitan Museum of Art. Her paternal great-grandfather, Jonathan Sturges, her maternal great-grandfather William Earl Dodge Sr. and her paternal grandfather, William Henry Osborn, were all superior art patrons of the Hudson River School and were associated with Frederic Edwin Church— William Osborn was a close fellow of the artist. Moreover, her father-in-law, commodore Cornelius Vanderbilt, had founded Vanderbilt University. The money that the Osborn men had made allowed the Osborn women to create a philanthropic base, which future women would then form.

Not only men, but also the women in Aileen Osborn's childhood gave her a motivational model of the Gilded Age philanthropy and consistently state that her work was the biggest supporter to the country's crafts. Alice Dodge's philanthropic accomplishments were a big part of Aileen's memories as a girl. Aileen's mother was also a well-known supporter of the Bellevue School of Nursing. Her mother-in-law, Mrs. William H. Osborn, who worked as the School's first president in 1873, inspired Alice. Alice Osborn later took her mother-in-law's place as president of the School. Another woman who inspired Aileen was her maternal aunt, Mary Melissa Hoadley ("Aunt May"), the unmarried heir to the copper fortune who supported Aileen Osborn financially to develop her crafts domain.

== Philanthropy ==
Born into an American family of philanthropists who were known as victorious manufacturers, financiers and scientists, Aileen Osborn Webb was the best craft supporter of the 20th century. She was raised in Garrison, New York and Manhattan where she was surrounded by people who supported giving back to the communities that helped make them so successful.

In the 1920s, Aileen was Vice Chairman of the Democratic Party. She also participated with the Junior League, which was co-founded by her sister-in-law Frederica Vanderbilt Webb, along with Mary Harriman and Dorothy Whitney in 1907.

During the Great Depression, she encouraged the poor to sell handmade goods to improve their financial situations. She founded America House in New York in 1940. In 1941, she helped start Craft Horizons magazine. In 1943, she founded the American Craft Council.

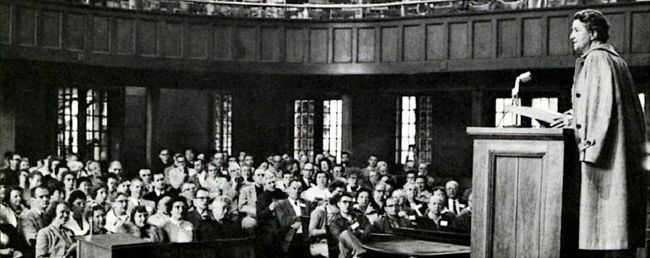
Aileen Webb addressing the Third Annual Conference of American Craftsmen, June 19–21, 1959, at Lake George, New York.

In 1944, she founded the School of the American Craftsman (SAC), now part of the Rochester Institute of Technology in Rochester, New York. In 1948, Shelburne Craft School established a pottery studio and kiln, thanks to Aileen Osborn Webb. In 1956, she founded the Museum of Contemporary Crafts, now known as the Museum of Arts and Design, the first museum to exhibit craft art by living artists. In 1964, she created the World Crafts Council to support indigenous craftspeople around the world.

== America House ==
During the Great Depression, she began a crafts group named Putnam County Products in her hometown of Peekskill, New York, which was created to assist local craftsmen sell their products. When Aileen noticed that there was a need for an organization that would help the craft members find broader markets to help them sell the products, she created the Handcraft Cooperative League of America in 1940. The group would carry the finest quality of crafts from within the country, and they chose New York as its location. She and her associates felt that the more crafts they sold, the more lives they would advance, not only on a financial rank for the artists, but a greater rank of meaning for the buyers as well." In the late 1930s, Webb became interested in craft making herself. She was a potter, enamelist, watercolorist, and wood carver.

The America House was an outlet for crafts. "The name "America House" was suggested by league member Laurits Christian Eichner, a pewter craftsman". Selling was not always the marketing strategy at the America House. In the early 1940s, Webb and her associates held many craft exhibitions. "America House gallery could tour Craftsmanship of New England." Their exhibitions offered the best of local contemporary crafts such as, furniture, tapestry, and stained glass. The Hands of Servicemen, on exhibit later that year, reflected current affairs and Webb's own desire to see servicemen equipped with useful skills.

Throughout these exhibitions, Webb was creating shows that defined her belief in the potential of craft to elevate society's tastes. These exhibitions also offered useful skills to people who were interested in crafts as a career and served as a political tool between countries. Exhibition space need became an official goal of the American Craftsmen's Council after its primary success exhibiting crafts at America House. Contemporary Furniture from the School for American Craftsmen began at the America House gallery in 1951. Aileen Webb indicated how education and marketing that were linked intimately were to the success of the contemporary craftsmen, and she used the chance to display the students' work to benefit public exposure for the developing artists. Craft Horizons was an informal newsletter published by Aileen Webb in 1941. Although it started out as a simple newsletter published after Mrs. Webb recognized the significance of communicating America House's activities, it eventually became a leader in the documentation of the craft world. By 1979, Craft Horizons averaged an impressive 40,000 copies in its monthly circulations. Known today as American Craft, Craft Horizons has become the country's main craft publication.

== Other houses ==
In the 1950s, she bought a penthouse residence that combined two apartments designed by David Campbell on East 72nd Street in Manhattan. Her living-room included a painting by Claude Monet and her front entrance weavings by Lenore Tawney. She also owned a painting by Paul Gauguin. Her penthouse included a studio, where she handcrafted, wood carved, painted and wrote poetry.

She spent her weekends in her hometown house in Garrison, which included a table by Wendell Castle. She summered in her husband's family home, Shelburne Farms in Shelburne, Vermont, where she had a "glass house" built on Lake Champlain. This house was furnished with modern furniture, and a large mural by Glen Michaels.

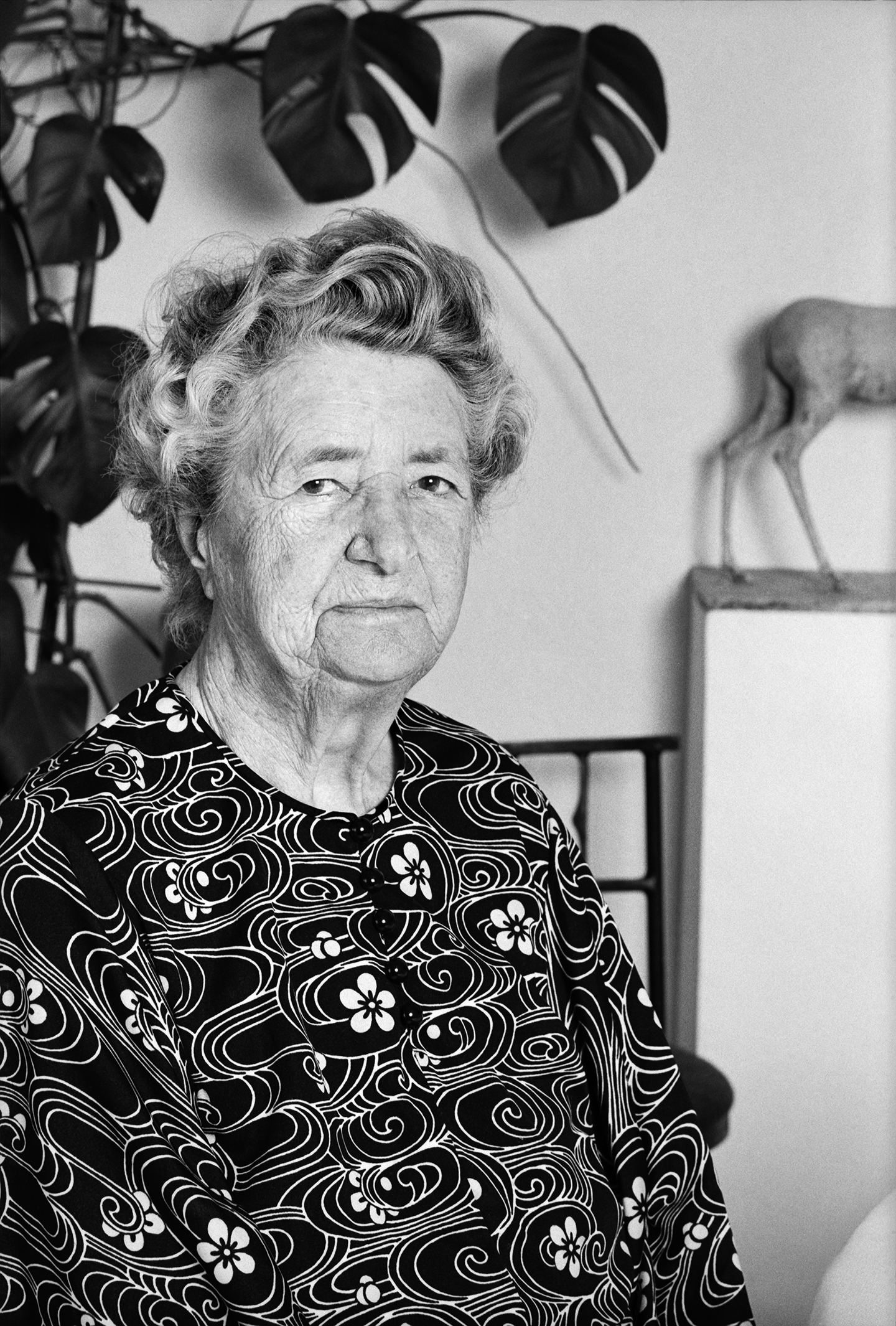
Aileen Osborn Webb photographed in New York City 1978 by Lynn Gilbert

== Death ==
Webb died on August 15, 1979, at the age of 87, in her home in Garrison, New York.
