= Craft Horizons =

American crafts magazine

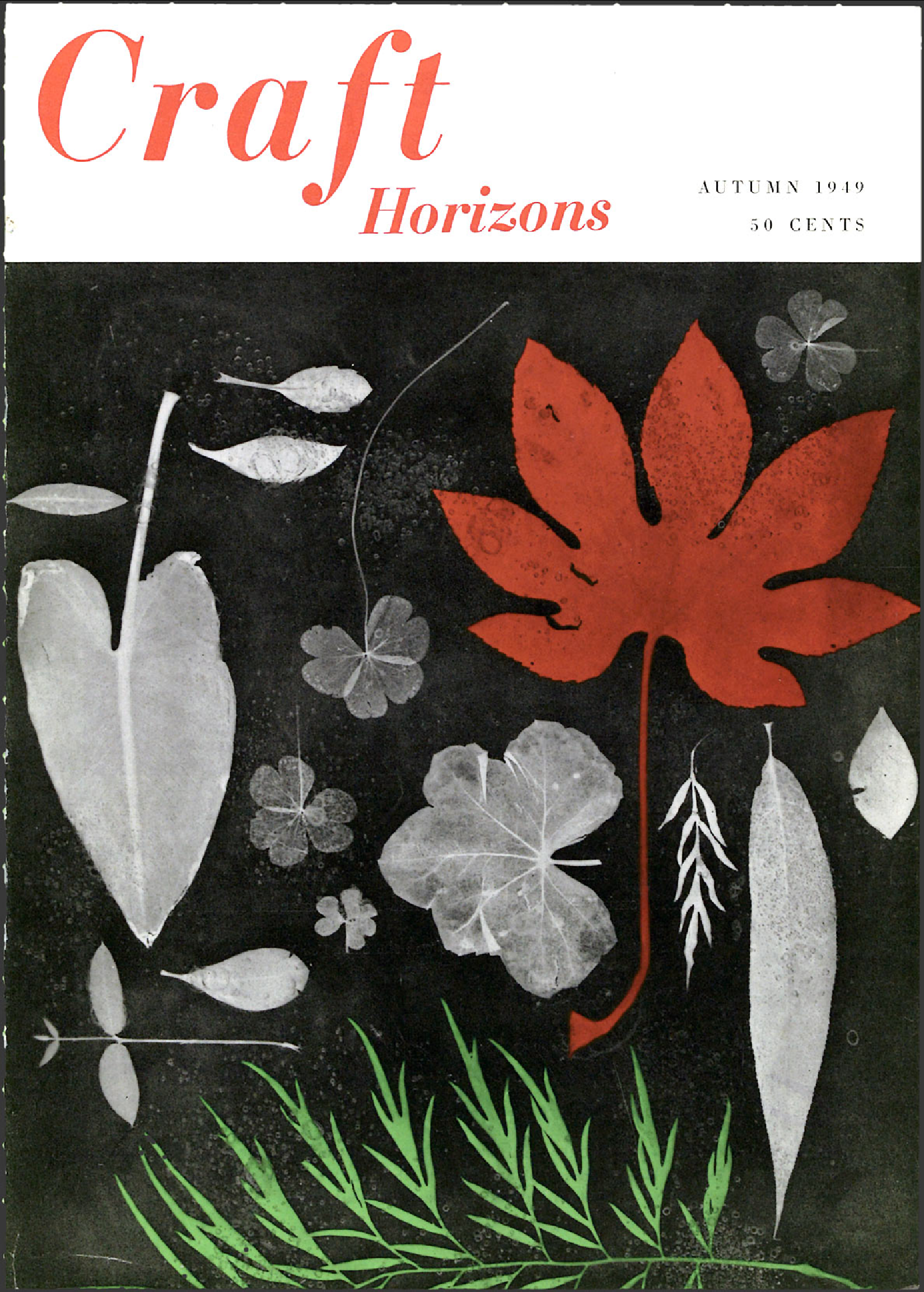
- Craft Horizons cover featuring detail of work by Emile Norman, 1949
- Former editors: Aileen Osborn Webb, Mary Lyon, Belle Krasne, Conrad Brown, Rose Slivka
- Categories: Arts and crafts
- Publisher: American Craft Council
- Founder: Aileen Osborn Webb
- Founded: 1941
- First issue: November 1941
- Final issue: May 1979
- Country: USA
- Language: English
- Website: digital.craftcouncil.org/digital/collection/p15785coll2

Craft Horizons was a periodical magazine that documents and exhibits crafts, craft artists, and other facets of the field of American craft. The magazine was founded by Aileen Osborn Webb and published from 1941 to 1979. It included editorials, features, technical information, letters from readers, and photographs of craft artists, their tools, and their works. The magazine both "documented and shaped" the changing history of the American craft movement. It was succeeded by American Craft in 1979.

== History ==
Craft Horizons was founded and initially edited by Aileen Osborn Webb, who also founded the organization now known as the American Craft Council. Craft Horizons began as an untitled newsletter in November 1941, sent out to artists who had purchased stock in, and consigned works to, America House. One of Webb's earliest initiatives in support of craft, America House was a New York retail shop that featured pieces from artists around the country. The shop was intended to provide a marketplace for rural artists in particular.

Among other content, Volume 1, Issue 1 featured an essay by Richard F. Bach, a curator at the Metropolitan Museum of Art in New York City, asking “What is a Craftsman?”. Throughout its nearly forty-year history, Craft Horizons sought to create networks of craftspeople and to stimulate discussion around the nature of craft as well as the work of craftspeople.

The first titled issue appeared in May 1942, with a print run of 3,500 copies. In 1947, Mary Lyon, a daughter of S. S. McClure, became the first professional editor of Craft Horizons. During the 1940s and 1950s, Aileen Osborn Webb still continued to write editorials. She often addressed professional and economic issues, such as the need for high standards of design, fair wages, education of the public, and craft-focused exhibitions. In 1951 Craft Horizons began working with Westbury Publishing and went from a quarterly periodical to publishing six times a year.

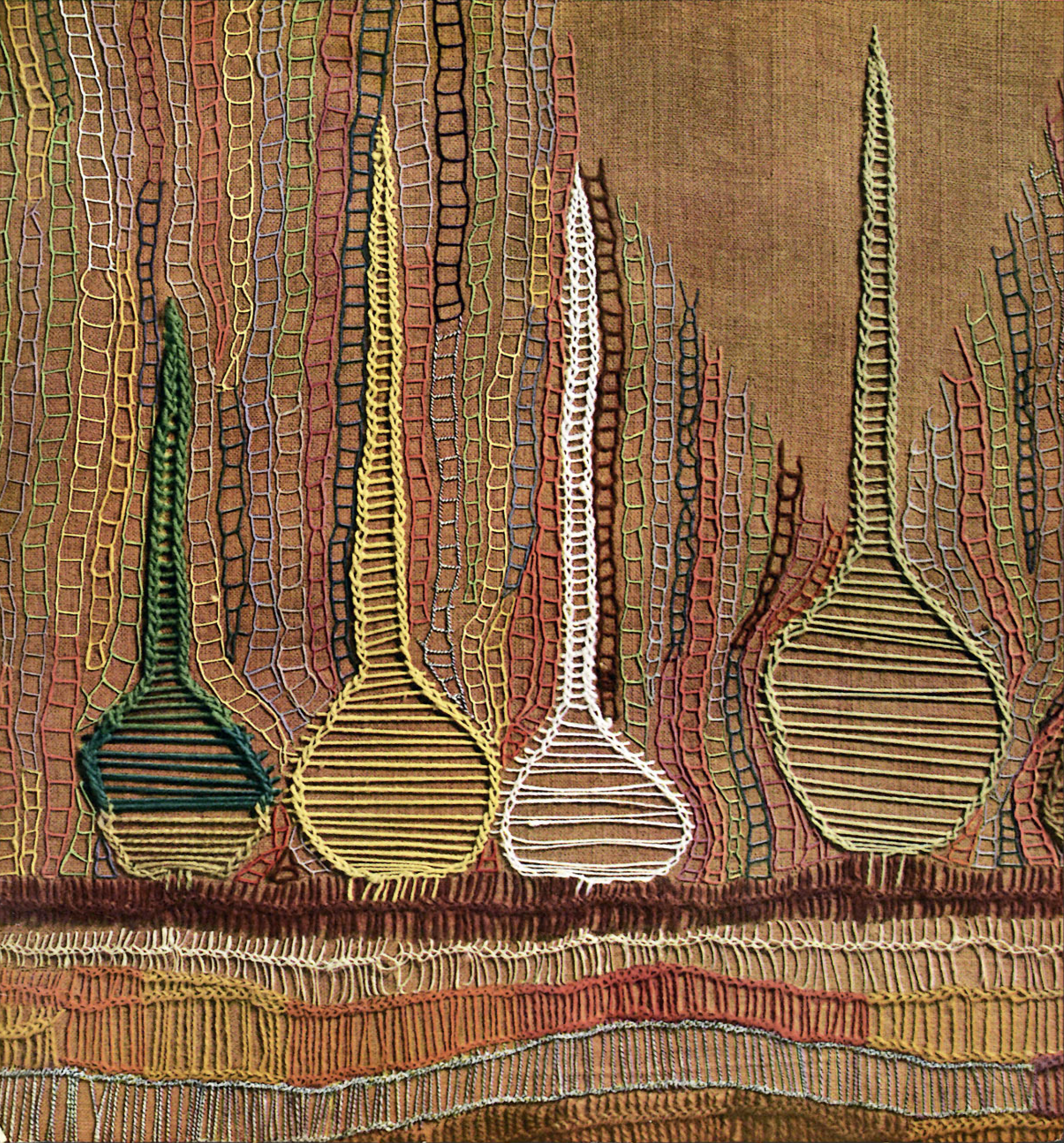
Mariska Karasz, Detail of wall panel "Alchemy", from the front cover of Craft Horizons, 1953.

From 1954 to 1955, Craft Horizons was edited by Belle Krasne, who left to marry Irving S. Ribicoff. She was succeeded by Conrad Brown. From 1959 to 1979 the editor in chief of Craft Horizons was Rose Slivka, the associate editor since 1955. At a time when the field of craft was growing rapidly, Slivka is credited with helping to define its philosophy and terminology. She also moved the focus of the magazine away from an emphasis on traditional techniques, foregrounding artistic forms and innovative expression.

Craft Horizons was innovative in its inclusivity of women. It was founded by a woman, its first board of directors included a majority of women, all but one of its editors-in-chief were women, and its editorial coverage was generally balanced in its presentation of men and women.

It was also innovative in its breadth and focus. Previous craft periodicals were associated with particular movements or aesthetic points of view (e.g. Ver Sacrum, The Craftsman, Henry L. Wilson's The Bungalow). Publications in the hobby craft movement focused on do-it-yourself patterns, plans and techniques (e.g. Needlecraft, Stitchcraft, The Deltagram and The Home Craftsman). Craft Horizons was the first periodical to put craft into a conceptual framework, addressing its meaning in society, and connecting aesthetic concerns and practical skills. It became a public forum for debates and disagreements about the nature and practice of craft, documented in its editorials, reviews and letters.

In terms of its design trajectory, photography began to appear soon after World War II and color photography was introduced in the late 1940s. The design of the early magazine and its covers was influenced by Sydney Butchkes. He began working with the magazine as early as 1947 and was the first credited art director as of November 1948. The first issue to appear in 1950 marked a major shift: rather than a traditional artwork, it featured abstraction, a stencil by Joan Miró. In 1956, the magazine's look and logo were redesigned by Ivan Chermayeff and Robert Brownjohn.

Craft Horizons became a resource for scholars as well as for artists, enthusiasts, and casual hobbyists. While it began with a focus on the traditional craftwork of the United States, Craft Horizons soon developed an international focus, driven in part by the many designers who left Europe due to World War II. It reached an international audience as well as connecting far-flung members of the North American art craft community.

As of 1960, Craft Horizons was officially incorporated as a publication of what was then the American Craftsmen's Council (ACC). In 1976, Aileen Osborn Webb stepped down from the chairmanship of the ACC and was succeeded by Barbara Olsen Rockefeller. Webb died on August 15, 1979. Also in 1979, the ACC was rebranded as the American Craft Council, Craft Horizons became American Craft, and Rose Slivka wrote her last editorial for it.

== The Good Making of Good Things ==
The Good Making of Good Things: Craft Horizons Magazine, 1941 – 1979 chronicles the nearly 40 year history of Craft Horizons magazine. This exhibition presents objects created by makers in the context of articles, reviews, and letters from the magazine. It was curated by Elizabeth Essner, Lily Kane, and Meaghan Roddy. It has appeared at the Center for Craft, Creativity & Design (CCCD) in Asheville, North Carolina (2017), the Ceramics Research Center at the Arizona State University Art Museum in Tempe, Arizona (2018), and the Minnesota Museum of American Art in Saint Paul, Minnesota (2019).

The title of the exhibition was inspired by a quotation in an editorial by Rose Slivka, who wrote:

The meaning of the good making of good things by hand is a communicable act—valued and marketable—a palpable chain through which each human being touches the other and is known through hand and craft.

== Archives ==
- Digital archives for issues of Craft Horizons (1941–1979) and American Craft (1979–1990)
