= American Craft Council =

National non-profitable organization

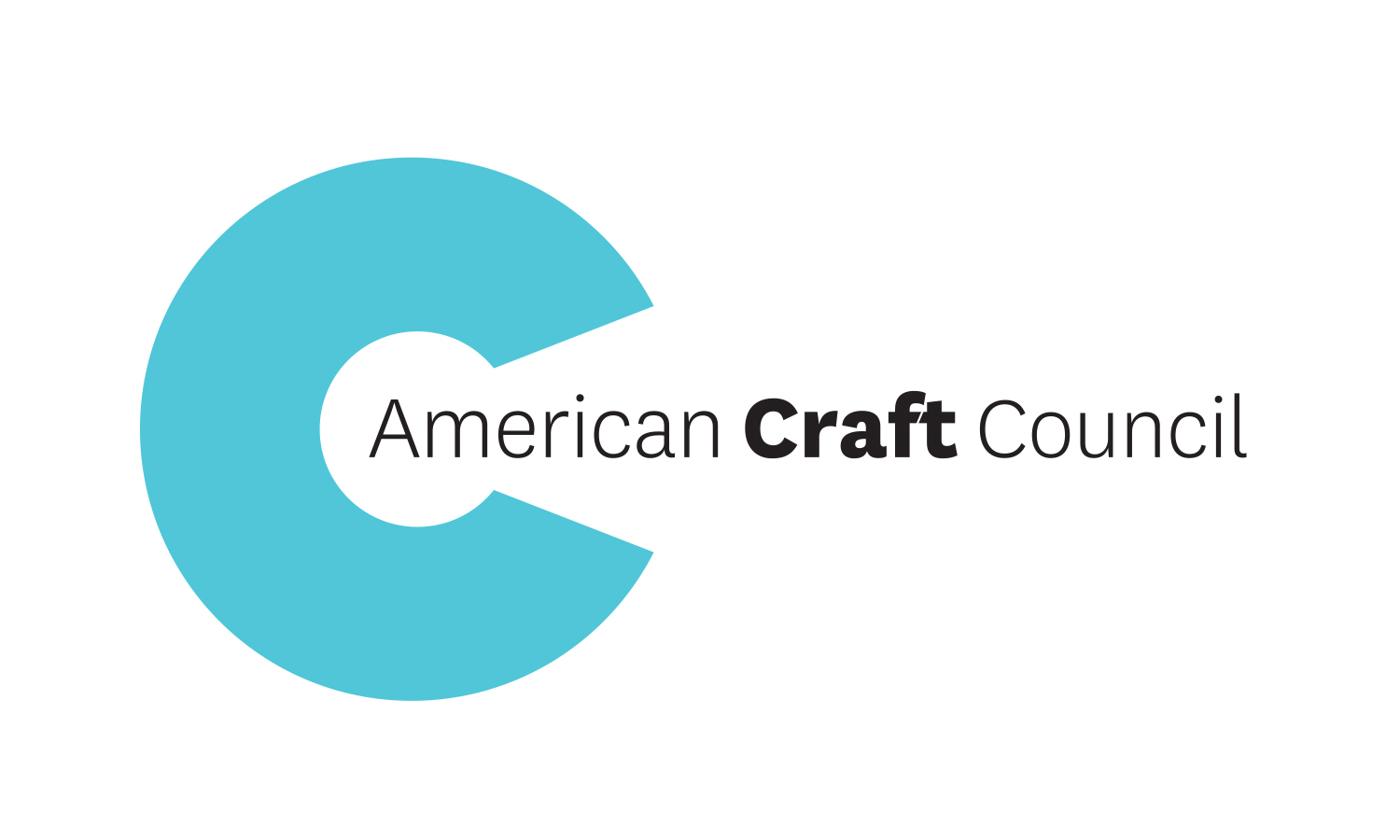
- Abbreviation: ACC
- Formation: 1943
- Founder: Aileen Osborn Webb
- Merger of: Handcraft Cooperative League of America and American Handcraft Council
- Legal status: Non-profit educational organization
- Purpose: The American Craft Council champions craft.
- Headquarters: Minneapolis, Minnesota, U.S.
- Location: 1224 Marshall Street NE, Suite 200, Minneapolis, Minnesota
- Coordinates: 44°59′59.44″N 93°16′12.3″W
- Website: craftcouncil.org
- Formerly called: American Craftsmen's Cooperative Council (1942–1951); American Craftsmen’s Educational Council (1943–1955); American Craftsmen's Council (1955–1969); American Crafts Council (1969–1979)

The American Craft Council (ACC) is a national non-profit organization that champions craft based in Minneapolis, Minnesota. Founded in 1943 by Aileen Osborn Webb, the council hosts national craft shows and conferences, publishes a quarterly magazine called American Craft and a quarterly journal called American Craft Inquiry, maintains an extensive awards program, and is home to a comprehensive library and archives.

== History ==
In 1939, philanthropist and social advocate Aileen Osborn Webb formed the Handcraft Cooperative League of America, an affiliation of craft groups organized to develop markets in metropolitan areas for rural craftsmen. The same year, the American Handcraft Council was formed in Delaware by Anne Morgan, a friend and neighbor of Webb. In 1940, Webb's League opens a cooperative retail venue called America House at 7 East 54th Street in Manhattan. In 1941, they publish a first, untitled issue of what would later become the magazine Craft Horizons. In 1942, Morgan's American Handcraft Council and Webb's Handcraft Cooperative League of America merged into a single organization, the American Craftsmen's Cooperative Council. In 1943, the merged organizations initiated the American Craftsmen's Educational Council, and were granted a provisional charter from the Board of Regents of the Education Department of New York.

For the next decade, the Council maintained their New York retail venue, initiated exhibitions featuring practicing craft artists (including Designer Craftsmen USA, which was hosted by the Brooklyn Museum, the Art Institute of Chicago, and the San Francisco Museum of Art,) and hosted national competitions such as "Young Americans" for craftspeople under 30. In 1955, the American Craftsmen's Education Council shortened its name to the American Craftsmen's Council with the acronym ACC.

In 1956, the Council opened the Museum of Contemporary Crafts, now the Museum of Arts and Design, in a brownstone purchased by Webb at 29 West 53rd Street in New York City. The museum's inaugural exhibition Craftsmanship in a Changing World featured 314 objects by 180 craftspeople from 19 states. The new building also housed the offices for Craft Horizons and the council's first formal library space. The Council launched its first national conference and began publishing a newsletter, Outlook, in 1957. In 1959, the Council divested in the retail space America House, which relocated to a brownstone purchased by Webb until closing 1971. In 1960, Craft Horizons was officially incorporated into the Council and subscribers were automatically enrolled as members. For the next decade, the council continued to host conferences, present and tour exhibitions through the Museum of Contemporary Crafts, and expand educational and awards programs.

Rose Slivka was appointed editor-in-chief of Craft Horizons in 1959. In the July/August 1961 issue Slivka published the article The New Ceramic Presence, in which she reported on the abstract, sculptural work of Peter Voulkos, John Mason, and others. The article served as a flash point within the ceramic community for the divide between traditional and contemporary ideas about art in clay, but also brought more serious attention to ceramic art from the general art world.

In 1966, ACC held its first regional craft fair in Stowe, Vermont, a precursor to the annual shows the Council continues to present in Baltimore, Atlanta, Saint Paul, and San Francisco. In 1969, one year after celebrating its 25th anniversary, the American Craftsmen's Council changed its name to the American Crafts Council.

The 1970s brought many significant changes to ACC, including its first cohort of Fellows, elected in 1975. Over 200 craft artists, scholars, and philanthropists had been honored by 2017 through induction into the Council's College of Fellows. While continuing to host shows and conferences, the Council relocated in 1978 to 22 West 55th Street and in 1979 the Museum of Contemporary Crafts reopened as the American Craft Museum at 44 West 53rd Street. The same year, Craft Horizons was renamed American Craft and founder Aileen Osborn Webb died at age 87.

Another series of relocations took place throughout the 1980s, and in 1990 the American Craft Museum became independent. At the Council's new, larger space at 72 Spring Street, the library had space to expand throughout the 1990s, taking on significant donations from the estate of glass artist Robert Sowers and from Ed Rossbach and Mildred Constantine. Efforts to develop a computer database for the library began in 1988, and the Council officially launched its website in 1999. In 2001, the library's catalog became accessible online.

=== Recent history ===
In the 2000s, the Council renamed and restructured its awards program and begins hosting "convenings," small-scale gatherings of key stakeholders in the field of craft meant to encourage peer-to-peer conversation. In 2010, ACC relocated from New York City to Minneapolis, Minnesota, establishing an office and library in the historic Grain Belt Brewery building at 1224 Marshall Street NE. Not long after the relocation, the Council launched a new website to include information for both American Craft magazine and the Council itself. In 2015, ACC launched several programs to highlight and serve emerging artists; Hip Pop, a shows initiative that provides a pathway for emerging artists to successfully take part in ACC shows, and Emerging Voices, an awards program that honors top emerging artist and scholars.
