= Kitty van der Mijll Dekker =

Dutch textile artist

- Kitty van der Mijll Dekker in her weaving studio in Nunspeet 1935
- Born: 22 February 1908; Yogyakarta, Dutch East Indies (now Indonesia)
- Died: 6 December 2004 (aged 96); Nijkerk, Netherlands
- Other names: Catharine Louise van der Dekker Mijll
- Known for: Textile Arts
- Movement: Bauhaus
- Spouse: Hermann Fischer (m. 1950)

Catharine Louise "Kitty" van der Mijll Dekker (1908-2004) was a Dutch textile artist. She studied at the Bauhaus and her designs are still being produced.

== Early life and education ==
Mijll Dekker was born on 22 February 1908 in Yogyakarta Dutch East Indies. In 1916 the family returned to the Netherlands. Around 1922 Mijll Dekker studied drawing at the Royal Academy of Art, The Hague and from 1926 through 1927 she studied at Hornsey College of Art in London. From 1927 through 1929 she studied interior design with Cor Alons. From 1929-1932 she studied at Walter Gropius' Bauhaus in Dessau, Germany. Gropius allowed both men and women into his art school, but relegated women to a workshop where they studied crafts, mainly weaving. Her teachers at the Bauhaus included Anni Albers, Otti Berger, Wassily Kandinsky, Paul Klee, Lilly Reich, Oskar Schlemmer, and Gunta Stölzl.

== Career ==
From 1932 through 1966 Mijll Dekker owned a commercial hand weaving mill Handweverij en Ontwerpatelier K.v.d. Mijll Dekker. During the same time frame she worked for the linen weaving mill E.J.F. van Dissel & Zn. From 1934 through 1970 she taught at the Kunstnijverheidsschool Quellinus in Amsterdam. Her students included Marjanne Doeksen, Dook van der Heijden, Willy Pennings, Margot Rolf, Désirée Scholten, and Herman Scholten. Mijll Dekker was a member of the artists society, Arti et Amicitiae.

=== Awards ===
In 1933 Mijll Dekker won a Silver medal at the Milan Triennial. In 1935 she won a Gold medal at the Brussels International Exposition as well as the Prix d'honneur (Paris). In 1936 she exhibited at the 1936 World's Fair winning a Gold medal. The same year she received a Quellinus Prize.

== Later life and legacy ==
Mijll Dekker married Hermann Fischer in 1950. Mijll Dekker died on 6 December 2004 in Nijkerk. Her work is in the Stedelijk Museum Amsterdam. Her 1935 design for a dish cloth is still being produced for the TextielMuseum in Tilburg.

== See also ==
- Women of the Bauhaus
