= Benita Koch-Otte =

German weaver and textile designer

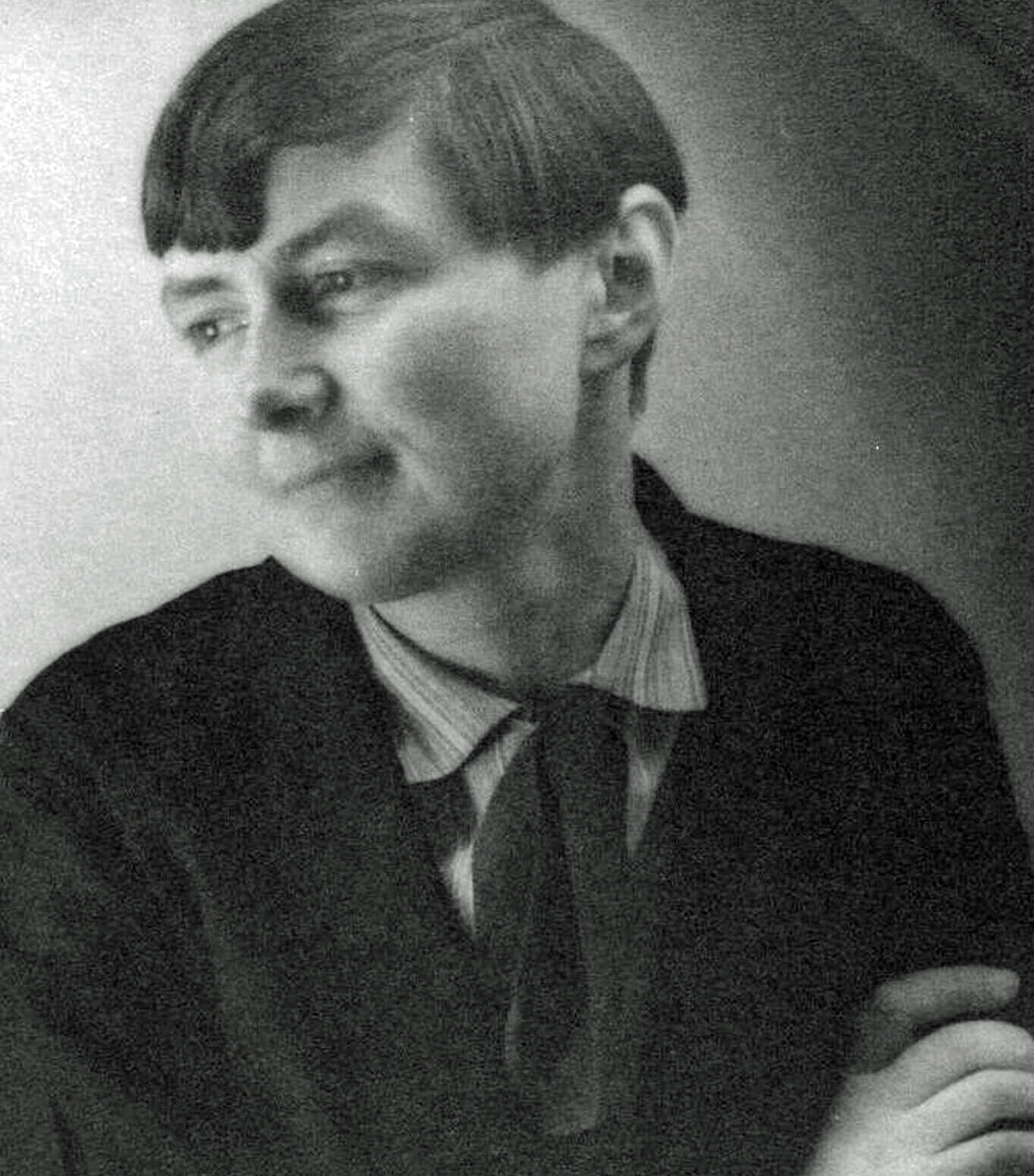
- Born: Benita Otte; 23 May 1892; Stuttgart, Germany
- Died: 26 April 1976 (aged 83); Bielefeld, Germany
- Spouse: Heinrich Koch (m.1929–1934, his death)

Benita Koch-Otte (née Benita Otte; 23 May 1892 – 26 April 1976) was a German weaver and textile designer who trained at the Bauhaus.

== Life and work ==
Benita Otte was born on 23 May 1892 in Stuttgart, Germany. Otte's father was a chemist.

After attending Lyceum in Krefeld, Otte taught drawing and physical education in Uerdingen. In 1920, she enrolled at the Bauhaus in Weimar where she studied in the studio's weaving workshop. She was later employed in the workshop, working closely with Gunta Stölzl. Otte left the Bauhaus in 1925.

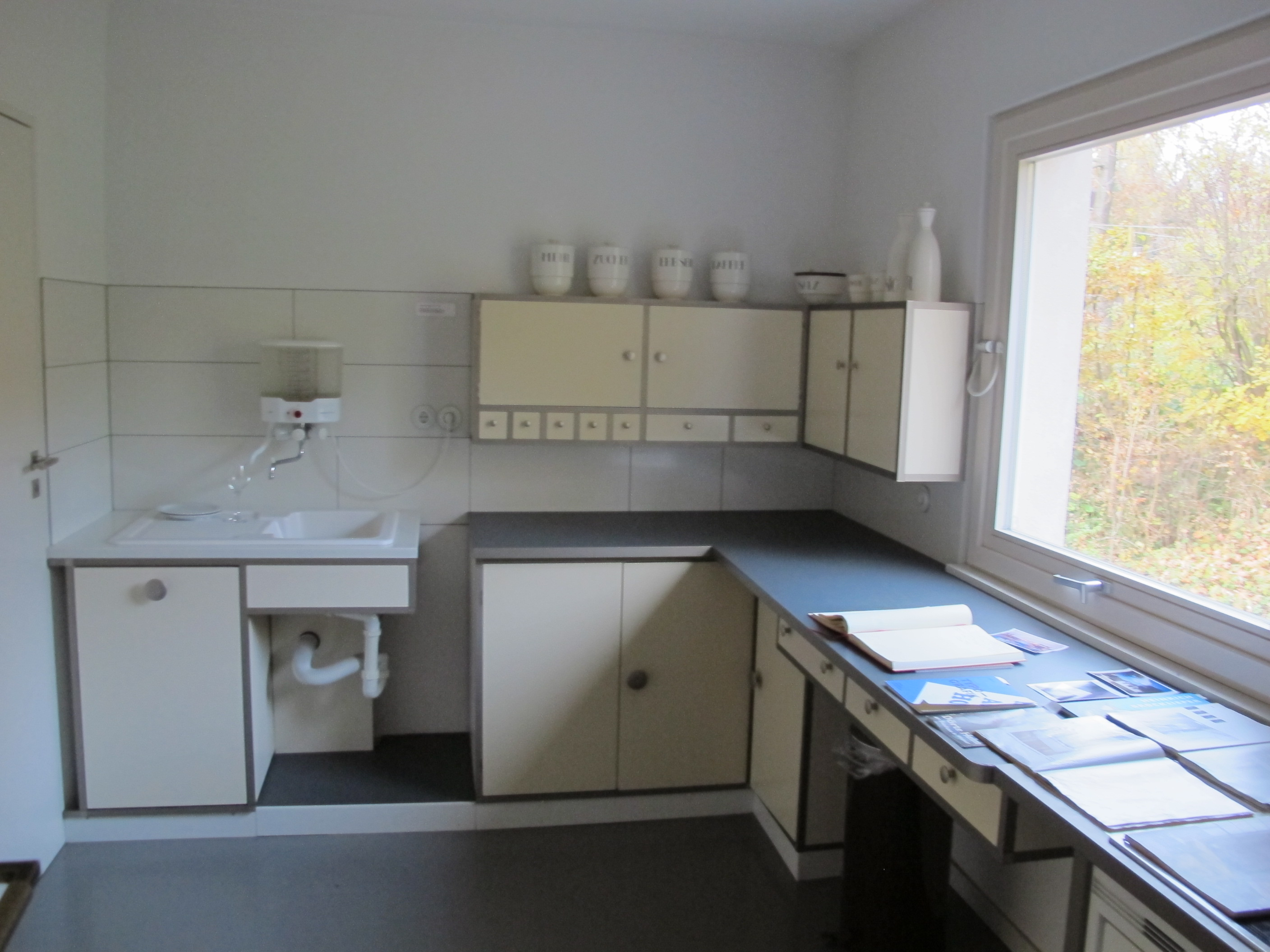
Kitchen of Haus am Horn

Although she worked primarily as a weaver, Otte, on a number of occasions, produced work beyond the medium. Notable among this work is Otte's design for the kitchen of the 1923 Haus am Horn in Weimar, which inspired Margarete Schütte-Lihotzky's 1926 Frankfurt kitchen.

After leaving the Bauhaus, Otte served as head of the weaving workshop at the Kunstgewerbeschule Burg Giebichenstein, a vocational arts college in Halle, now the Burg Giebichenstein University of Art and Design. In 1929 she reunited with the Czech photographer Heinrich Koch (1896–1934) who studied with Otte at the Bauhaus; Benita married Koch later that year.

A number of former students and teachers from the Bauhaus went to work at the school, including: Gerhard Marcks, the Rector from 1928 until 1933; Hans Wittwer, who ran the Architecture department; Marguerite Friedländer and Erich Consemüller. Following the Nazi rise to power in 1933, Koch-Otte and other staff considered avant-garde were dismissed from the school.

Koch-Otte and her husband then moved to Prague. Heinrich Koch died in an accident in 1934, and Benita returned to Germany, where she taught at the Bodelschwingh Foundation Bethel (German:Bodelschwinghsche Stiftungen Bethel), a psychiatric hospital in the Bethel district of Bielefeld. At the hospital, Koch-Otte ran weaving workshop for patients. She worked at the foundation until her 1957 retirement.

== Death and legacy ==
Koch-Otte died on 26 April 1976 in Bielefeld, Germany.

Former students of Benita Koch-Otte include Trude Guermonprez and Anni Albers, among others.

Benita Koch-Otte Street (Benita-Otte-Straße) in Erfurt, Germany is named after her.

Koch-Otte's work was included in the 2021 exhibition Women in Abstraction at the Centre Pompidou.

== See also ==
- Women of the Bauhaus
