= Ilse Fehling =

German costume designer

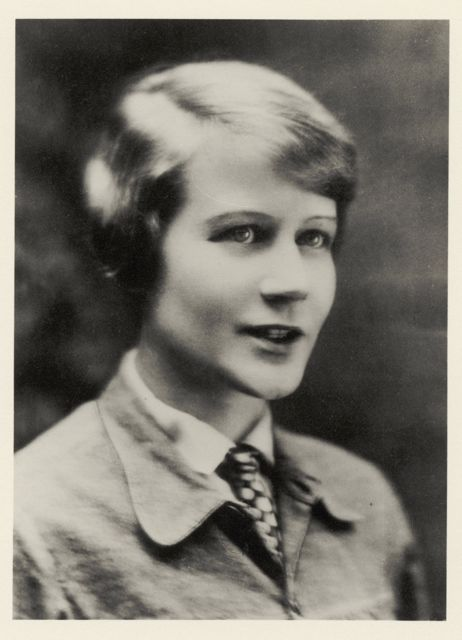
- Ilse Fehling in 1928
- Born: April 25, 1896; Danzig-Langfuhr, Germany
- Died: February 25, 1982 (aged 85); Munich, Germany

Ilse Fehling was a German costume designer and sculptor associated with the Bauhaus and Nazi propaganda films.

== Early life and education ==
Ilse Fehling was born on April 25, 1896, in Danzig-Langfuhr, Germany. In 1919, Fehling enrolled at the Reimann School in Berlin, where she studied art and fashion design. While in Berlin, she additionally studied at the city's Kunstgewerbeschule. It was there that Fehling began to study sculpture.

In 1920, Fehling matriculated at the Bauhaus Weimar, where much of her work focused on theatre design. Additionally, she studied sculpture, painting, and theory of harmonization under a number of prominent artists including Oskar Schlemmer, Paul Klee, and Gertrud Grunow. Out of her work at the school, Fehling's best known is the rotating round puppet stage she designed and later patented in her theater class with Lothal Schreyer.

== Career ==
In 1923, she left the Bauhaus for Berlin to work as a freelance sculptor and stage and costume designer.

Fehling received the Rome Prize from the Prussian Academy of Arts in 1932; she later studied in Rome using a grant associated with the award. In the following years, her work took influences from Cubism.

Following the Nazi rise to power, Fehling's work was deemed degenerate and its exhibition was banned. Much of her work was lost due to bombing and confiscation during World War II.

Fehling had begun working as a costume designer in 1926 and continued this work after the 1933 rise of Nazism in Germany, working on propaganda films including Der Herrscher.

In 1940, Fehling began work at Tobis-Europa as the chief outfitter. Here she optimized the costume department by expanding and continuing to develop it. While working there, Fehling implemented a system for reusing previously-worn costumes. During World War II, she published an article on creative costume reuse in the popular fashion press as an inspiration to women living under rationing.

By 1946, Fehling lived in Rottack before returning to Munich in 1952 where she lived out the rest of her life. Fehling opened her own studio after settling in Munich, where she worked on sculptures, stage sets, and press drawings. Fehling did some additional work in Geneva, where her daughter was an international student. Her final design project was for the Cologne cinema "Die Lupe" in 1965, where she conceptualized the interior design.

== Personal life and death ==
In 1923, Fehling married Henry S. Witting. In 1928, she gave birth to a daughter, Gaby; she divorced Witting a year later. Fehling died on February 25, 1982.

== See also ==
- Women of the Bauhaus
