= Erich Consemüller =

German photographer and architect

Erich Consemüller (10 October 1902 — 11 April 1957) was a German photographer and architect who studied and taught at Bauhaus art school. He worked alongside the photographer Lucia Moholy documenting life at the Bauhaus.

== Early life ==
Consemüller was born in Bielefeld, Germany in 1902, where he spent his late teenage life training in carpentry, attending evening classes at the Bielefeld School of Arts and Crafts, now the Bielefeld University of Applied Sciences.

== Bauhaus ==
Consemüller began studying at the Bauhaus in Weimar in 1922, first taking Johannes Itten's preliminary course, as did all students. He also took classes by Paul Klee and Wassily Kandinsky. From 1923 to 1925 he studied furniture design in the carpentry workshop under Walter Gropius, the Bauhaus director. In March 1924 he passed the journeyman's qualification awarded by the Weimar Chamber of Crafts (German: Handwerkskammer). In summer that year he travelled to Iceland and returned to Weimar for the winter semester, during which he worked on the interior design of the Theatre Cafe (de) in Dessau. The Bauhaus was involved in a project to rebuild the theatre in 1927, following a fire in an earlier building. The new building was destroyed during World War II bombing.

In 1925 the Bauhaus moved to Dessau and Marcel Breuer took over teaching the carpentry workshop. Consemmüller studied under him until 1927, when he transferred to the newly established Building department, led by Hannes Meyer. He also taught in the Building Department from 1927 to 1929, and worked on the ADGB Trade Union School project in Bernau bei Berlin, which is now a World Heritage Site. He finished his studies March 1929 and was awarded his Bauhaus Diploma, Diploma number 4, in November 1929. He was one of only 155 students to ever get their Diploma.

=== Photographic Commission ===
In 1927, Consemüller was commissioned by Gropius to photographically document Bauhaus's activities and people. This resulted in the creation of around 300 photographs documenting the school's work and environment. "Bauhaus Scene," a frequently reproduced photograph of his, combines three works by Bauhaus artists in one photo. It depicts a woman sitting in Breuer's Wassily Chair, wearing a theatrical mask made by Oskar Schlemmer and a dress designed by Lis Beyer-Volger. Other notable photographs of his feature Bauhaus architecture, often with figures interposed.

== Halle ==
In 1929, Consemüller moved to the city of Halle, where he was employed in the architectural office of Hans Wittwer, a former Bauhaus teacher, until 1934. He married the Bauhaus trained textile artist Ruth Hollós-Consemüller in 1930. During this period he also taught at the Kunstgewerbeschule Burg Giebichenstein in Halle, now the Burg Giebichenstein Kunsthochschule Halle (Burg Giebichenstein University of Art and Design). A number of other former Bauhaus people, including Wittwer, also taught there. When the Nazis came to power in 1933, Consemüller, Wittwer, the Rector of the school Gerhard Marcks, and a number of other staff were dismissed.

Hans Wittwer closed his office and returned to Switzerland in 1934. Consemüller remained in Halle, working for the architect Gerhard Schwerthelm from 1934 to 1935 and later in other architectural offices in Halle and Erfurt. From 1935 to 1939, he work as a structural engineering technician for the Halle architect Wilhelm Ulrich. He then moved to Leipzig where he worked for the Bauhaus trained architect Walter Born until the end of World War II in 1945. From 1945 to 1946, he work for the Halle city council town planning department.

== Bibliography ==
- Herzogenrath, Wulf; Stefan Kraus, Stefan (eds.): Erich Consemüller. Fotografien Bauhaus-Dessau. Schirmer/Mosel, München 1989, ISBN 3-88814-310-1.
