= Lis Beyer =

German artist

- Born: Elisabeth Beyer; 1906; Hamburg, Germany
- Died: 1973 (aged 66–67); Süchteln, Germany
- Other names: Elisabeth Beyer-Volger
- Known for: Textile arts
- Spouse: Hans Volger (m. 1932; died in 1973)

Elisabeth "Lis" Beyer (1906-1973) was a German artist.

== Biography ==
Beyer was born in 1906 in Hamburg. She was a student at the Bauhaus where she was taught by Johannes Itten, Paul Klee, and Wassily Kandinsky. She worked at the Bauhaus weaving workshop with Georg Muche and Gunta Stölzl and performed in several instances alongside Oskar Schlemmer, director of the Bauhaus Stage Workshop, as part of rehearsals for the Triadic Ballet in 1926. She passed the Journeyman and Weaver examinations, and went on to teach weaving at the Maxschule in Würzburg.

Beyer was married to the artist Hans Volger (1904-1973) from 1932 until his death. They had two children. She died in 1973 in Süchteln.

== See also ==
- Women of the Bauhaus

== See also ==
- Women of the Bauhaus
