= Lothar Schreyer =

German artist

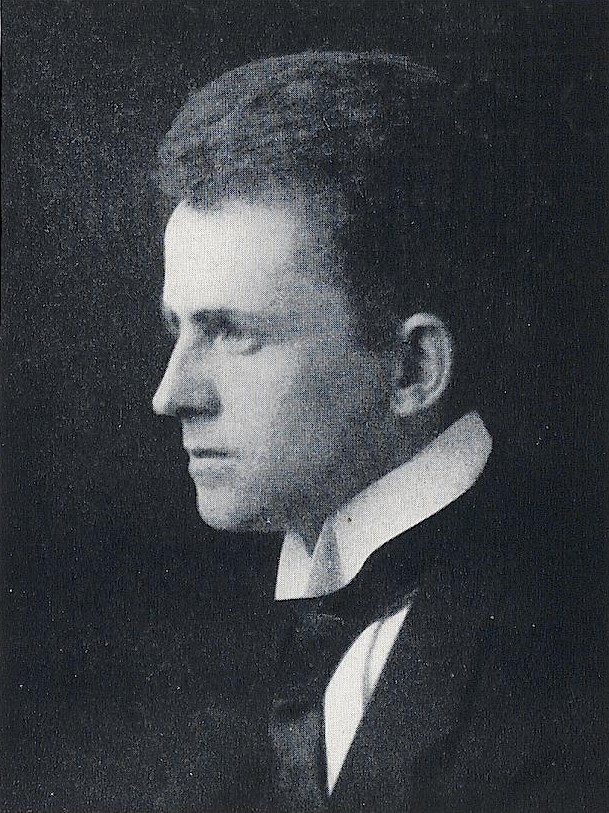
Portrait of Lothar Schreyer

Lothar Schreyer (19 August 1886, Blasewitz – 18 June 1966, Hamburg) was a German artist, writer, editor, stage designer and gallery owner. He was the first Master of the stagecraft workshop at the Bauhaus art school.

== Life and work ==
Schreyer was born into a Lutheran family in Blasewitz in 1886. He studied art history at University of Heidelberg and then law at universities in Berlin and Leipzig. In 1910, he graduated in literary and artistic copyright law.

From 1911 to 1918, he worked as a dramaturge and assistant director at the Deutsches Schauspielhaus in Hamburg and from 1916 until 1928, he was the editor of Der Sturm magazine, owned by Herwarth Walden, with whom he became a close collaborator on several projects. At the same time, he also taught at the Sturm-Schule für Bühnenkunst und Pantomime ('Sturm school of stagecraft and pantomime') until 1924.

In 1918, Scheyer and Walden founded the Sturmbühne, an expressionist theatre. Schreyer’s first plays Kreuzigung (Crucifixion) and Kindssterben (Death of a Child) were performed during his tenure as director there. Scheyer left the theatre in 1921.

In 1921, Walter Gropius, director of the Bauhaus in Weimar, invited him to lead school's stagecraft workshop. Gropius established the workshop to explore theatrical methods, as he saw similarities between building and stage work. Students from all departments were encouraged to participate. Scheyer, like fellow teachers Johannes Itten and Gertrud Grunow, was regarded as one of the Bauhaus 'esoterics', as opposed to the more technically-minded Gropius.

He was experimental and concealed his players behind geometric full-body masks to explore the language of form. However, his plays such as Mondspiel (Moon Play) and Kreuzigung (Crucifixion) were not well received at the school and he left in 1923. He was succeeded by Oskar Schlemmer.

From 1924 to 1927, he was a teacher at the Berlin art school 'Der Weg'. From 1928 to 1931, he was head editor of the publishing house Hanseatische Verlagsanstalt.

In 1933, he converted to Catholicism. During the 1930s, he was concerned with Christian mysticism and folk ideas, and ultimately the Nazi ideology. He was one of 88 German writers who signed the Gelöbnis treuester Gefolgschaft, a 1933 public declaration of faithful allegiance to Adolf Hitler. This did not stop his work being classified by the Nazis as degenerate art. It was shown in the 1937 Degenerate Art Exhibition (German: Die Ausstellung "Entartete Kunst") in Munich.

== Collections ==
Amongst other public collections, Schreyer's art work is held by:

- Los Angeles County Museum of Art (LACMA)
- Museum of Modern Art (MoMA), New York
- New York Public Library

== Bibliography ==
- Schreyer, Lothar; Keith-Smith, Brian (ed.) (2001, 3rd ed.)Theateraufsätze, New York: Edwin Mellen Press ISBN 978-0-7734-1354-2
