= Katt Both =

German photographer, furniture designer and architect

- Katt Both in the Wassily chair
- Born: 1905; Waldkappel, Kingdom of Prussia, German Empire
- Died: 1985 (aged 79–80); Kassel, West Germany
- Movement: Bauhaus

Katt Both (1905–1985) was a German photographer, furniture designer and architect.

Both studied furniture design at the Bauhaus from 1924 to 1928, under László Moholy-Nagy. Following this she worked for the brothers Hans and Wassili Luckhardt in Berlin. In March 1929 Otto Haesler in Celle hired her, where she was the first woman architect. Her work is included in the collections of the Getty Museum, the Art Gallery of New South Wales, the Minneapolis Institute of Art.

== See also ==
- Women of the Bauhaus

== Gallery ==
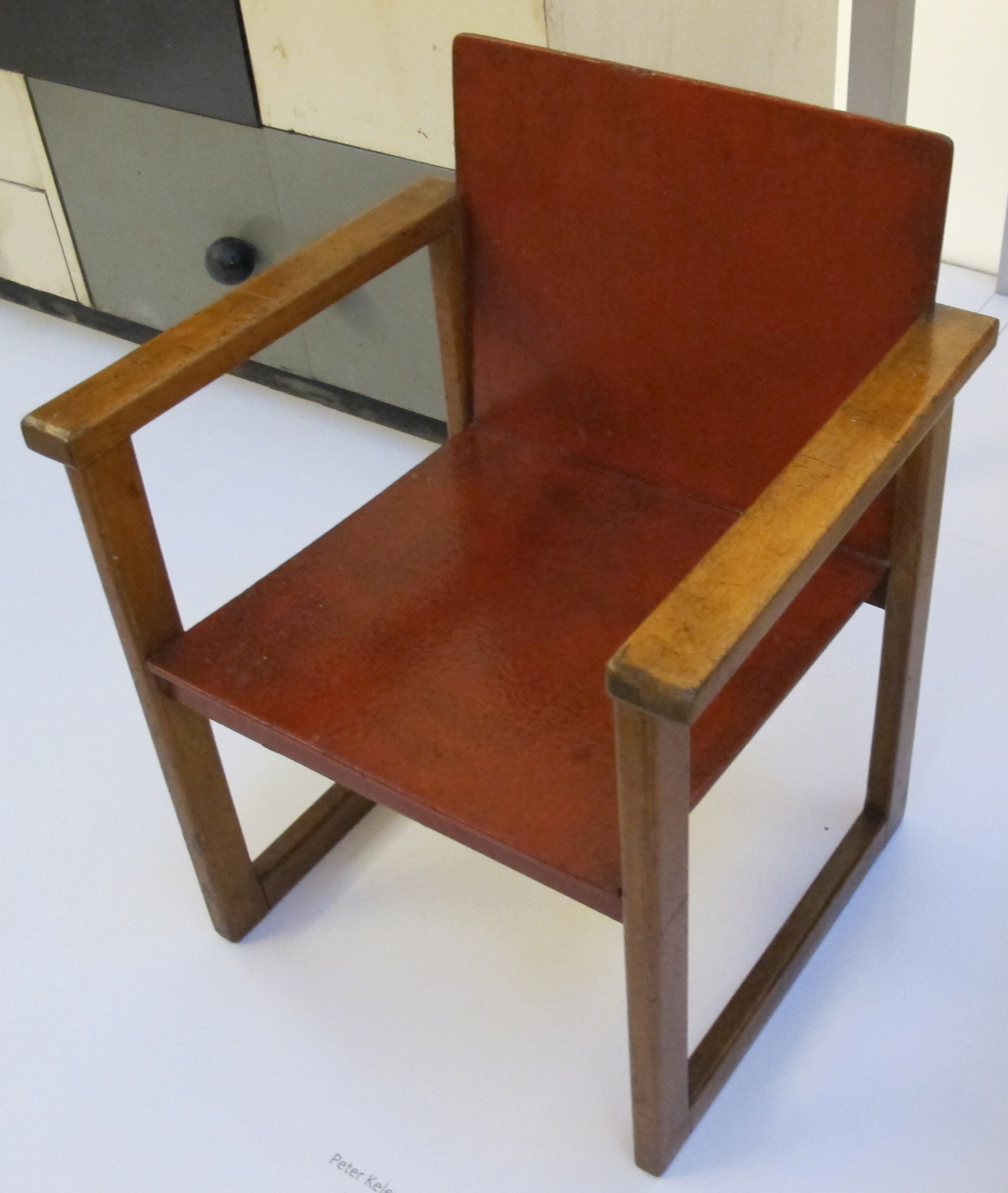
Children's chair, 1927, by Katt Both

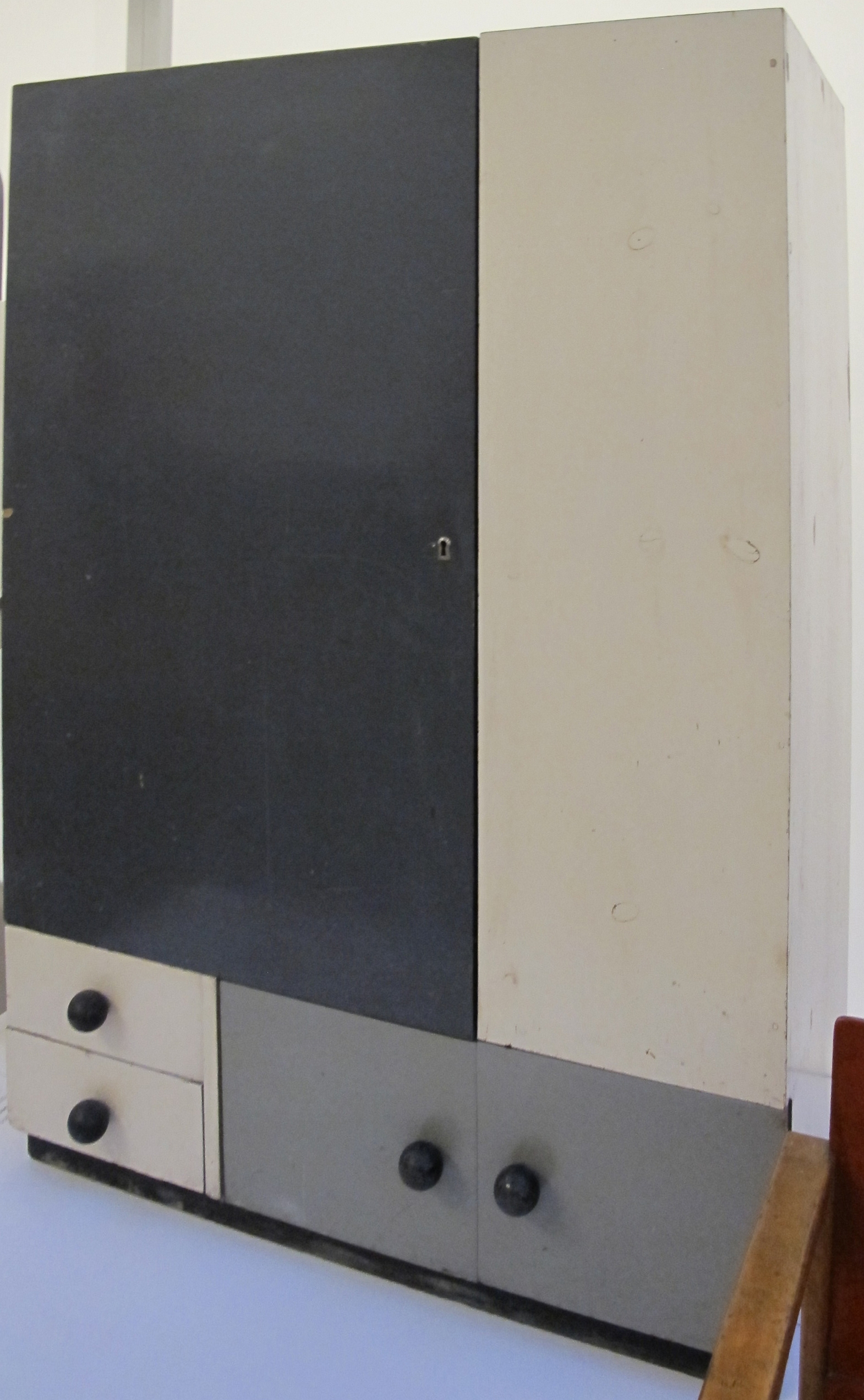
Children's armoire, 1927 by Katt Both
