= Anni Albers =

German-American textile artist (1899–1994)

- Born: Annelise Elsa Frieda Fleischmann; June 12, 1899; Berlin, German Empire
- Died: May 9, 1994 (aged 94); Orange, Connecticut, U.S.
- Education: Bauhaus
- Known for: Textiles; Graphic design Fine Art
- Spouse: Josef Albers (m. 1925; died 1976)
- Website: www.albersfoundation.org

Anni Albers (born Annelise Elsa Frieda Fleischmann; June 12, 1899 – May 9, 1994) was a German-Jewish visual artist and printmaker. A leading textile artist of the 20th century, she is credited with blurring the lines between traditional craft and art. Born in Berlin in 1899, Fleischmann began her studies under impressionist painter Martin Brandenburg from 1916 to 1919. She briefly attended the Kunstgewerbeschule in Hamburg in 1919. She later enrolled at the Bauhaus, an avant-garde art and architecture school founded by Walter Gropius in Weimar in 1922. At Bauhaus, she began exploring weaving after facing restrictions in other disciplines due to gender biases at the institution.

Under the guidance of Gunta Stölzl and Benita Koch-Otte, Fleischmann developed a passion for the tactile qualities of weaving, shifting her artistic focus from painting to textile art. In 1925, Fleischmann married fellow Bauhaus figure Josef Albers, taking on her husband's last name, and moved with the school to Dessau. The Bauhaus's emphasis on functional design led to innovations in materials that combined aesthetics with practical benefits like sound absorption and light reflection. She eventually headed the weaving workshop after Gunta Stölzl's departure in 1931. The political pressures of Nazi Germany forced the Albers to relocate to the United States in 1933, where Anni Albers took up a teaching position at Black Mountain College in North Carolina.

In 1949, Albers became the first textile designer to have a solo exhibition at the Museum of Modern Art in New York. After leaving Black Mountain College, she continued to create textile designs and ventured into printmaking. She practiced at the Tamarind Lithography Workshop in Los Angeles, and at screen printing studios in New Haven, Connecticut. In the subsequent years, the Josef and Anni Albers Foundation was founded to "perpetuate the vision of Anni and Josef Albers through exhibitions, publications, education, and outreach concomitant with the Alberses’ personal values".

== Early life and education ==
Anni Albers was a textile artist born Annelise Elsa Frieda Fleischmann on June 12, 1899, in Berlin, Germany. Her father was a general contractor and furniture maker, while her mother was a member of the Ullstein family, who owned a major publishing company. Even in her childhood, she was intrigued by art and the visual world. She painted during her youth and studied under impressionist artist Martin Brandenburg, from 1916 to 1919, but was very discouraged from continuing after a meeting with artist Oskar Kokoschka, who upon seeing a portrait of hers asked her sharply "Why do you paint?"

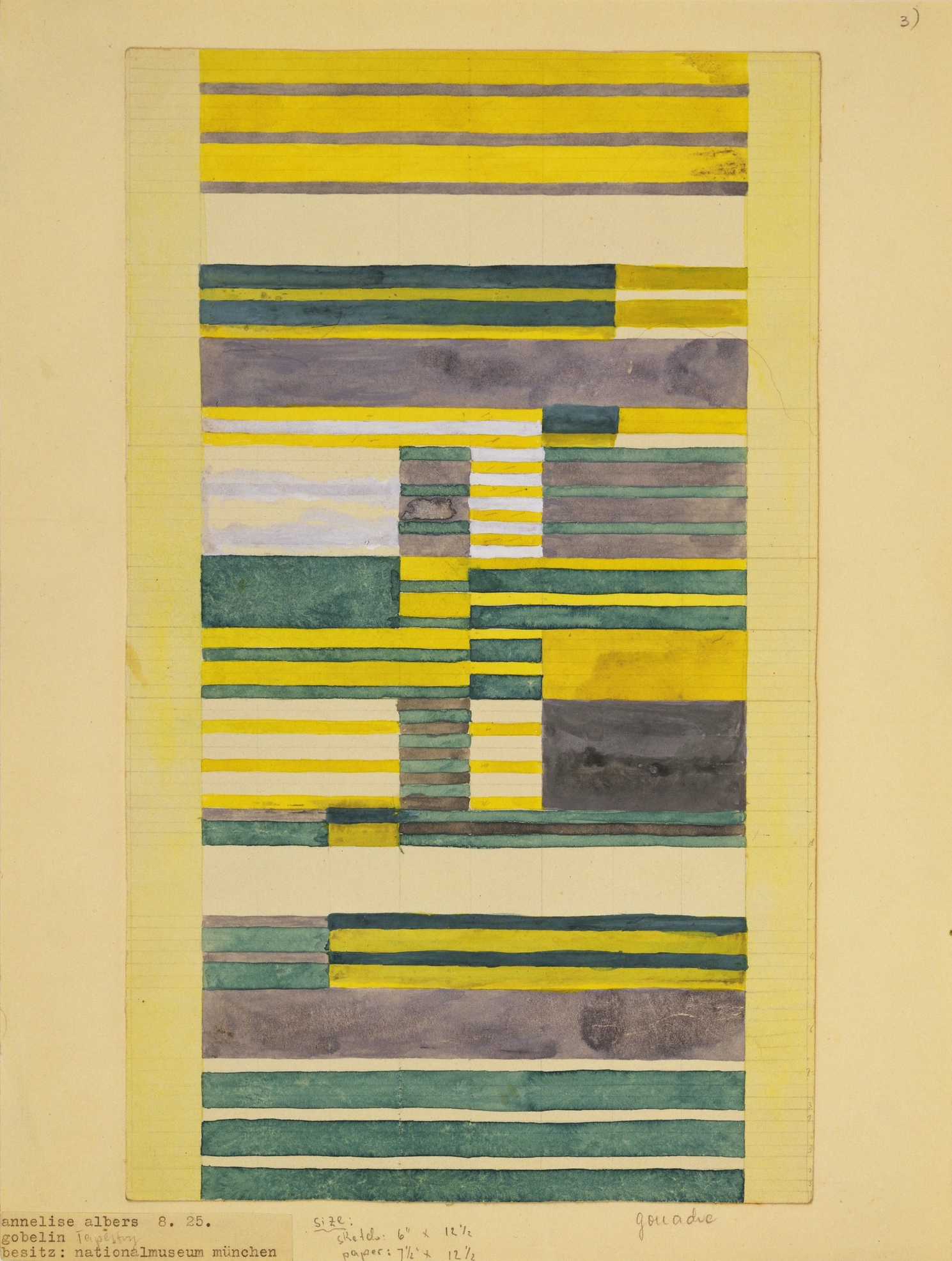
Design for Wall Hanging, 1925 (Harvard Art Museums)

Fleischmann eventually decided to attend art school, even though the challenges for art students were often great and the living conditions harsh. Such a lifestyle sharply contrasted with the affluent and comfortable living that she had been used to. She attended the Kunstgewerbeschule in Hamburg for only two months in 1919, decided to apply to the newly opened Bauhaus at Weimar. Her first application was unsuccessful, but she was accepted on her second attempt and began her studies in April 1922.

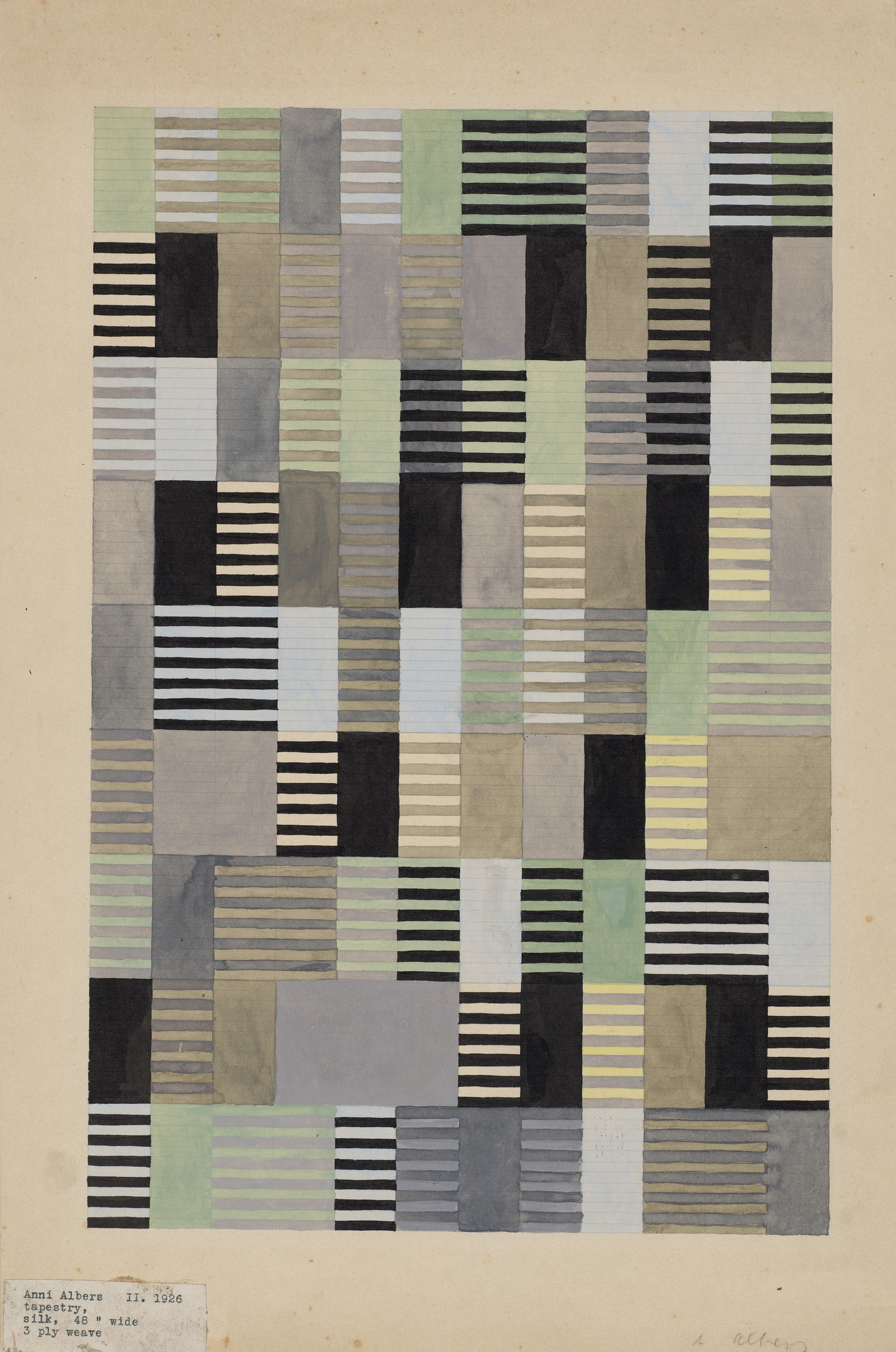
Design for a Silk Tapestry, 1926 (Harvard Art Museums)

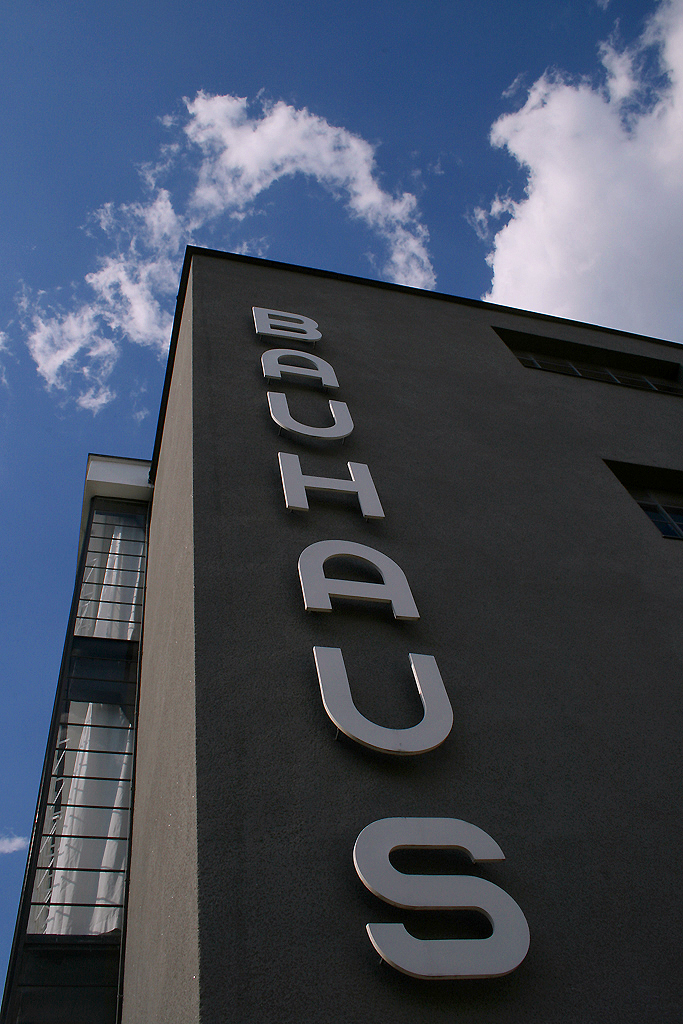
The Bauhaus in Dessau, Germany

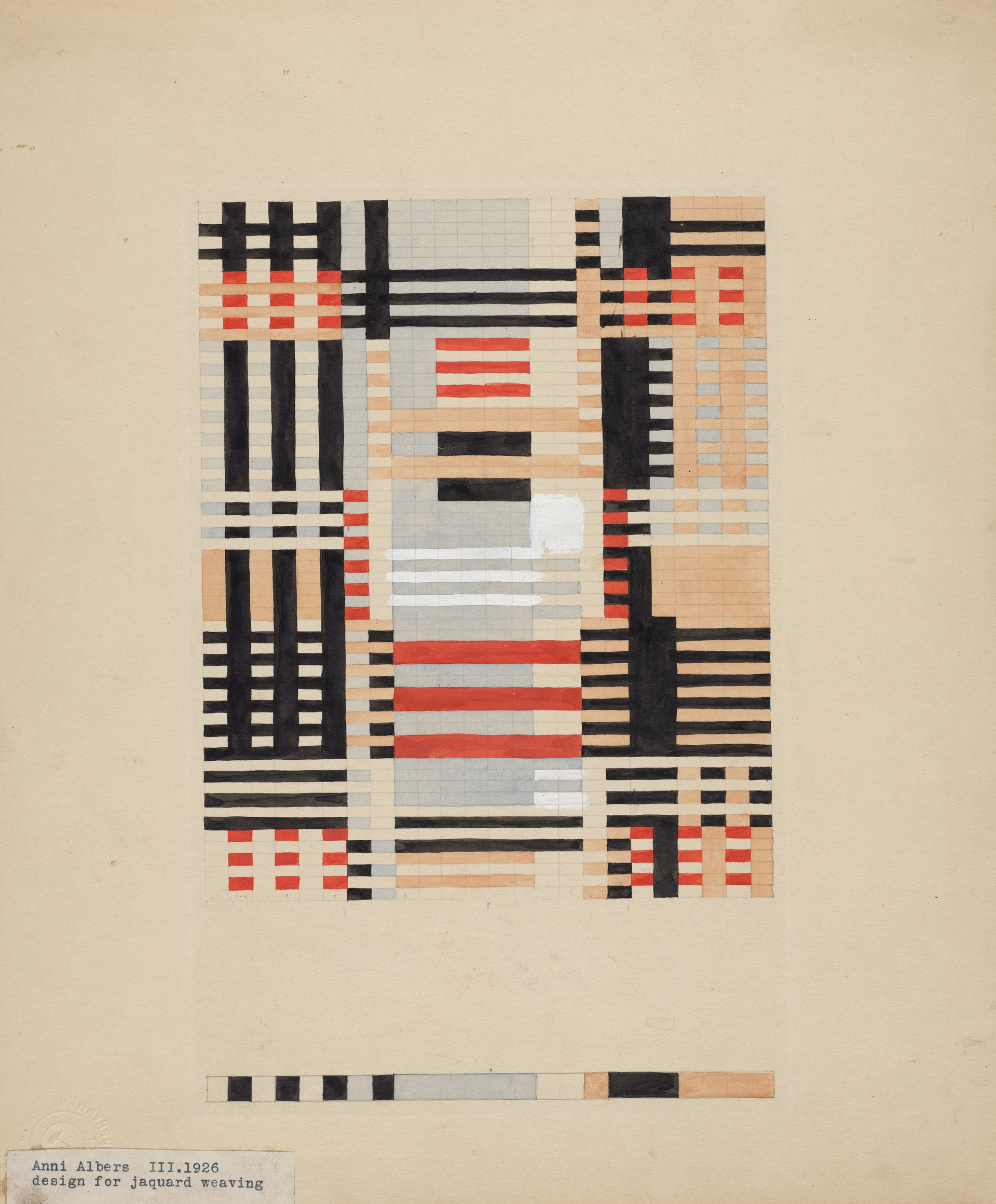
Design for a Jacquard Weaving, 1926 (Harvard Art Museums)

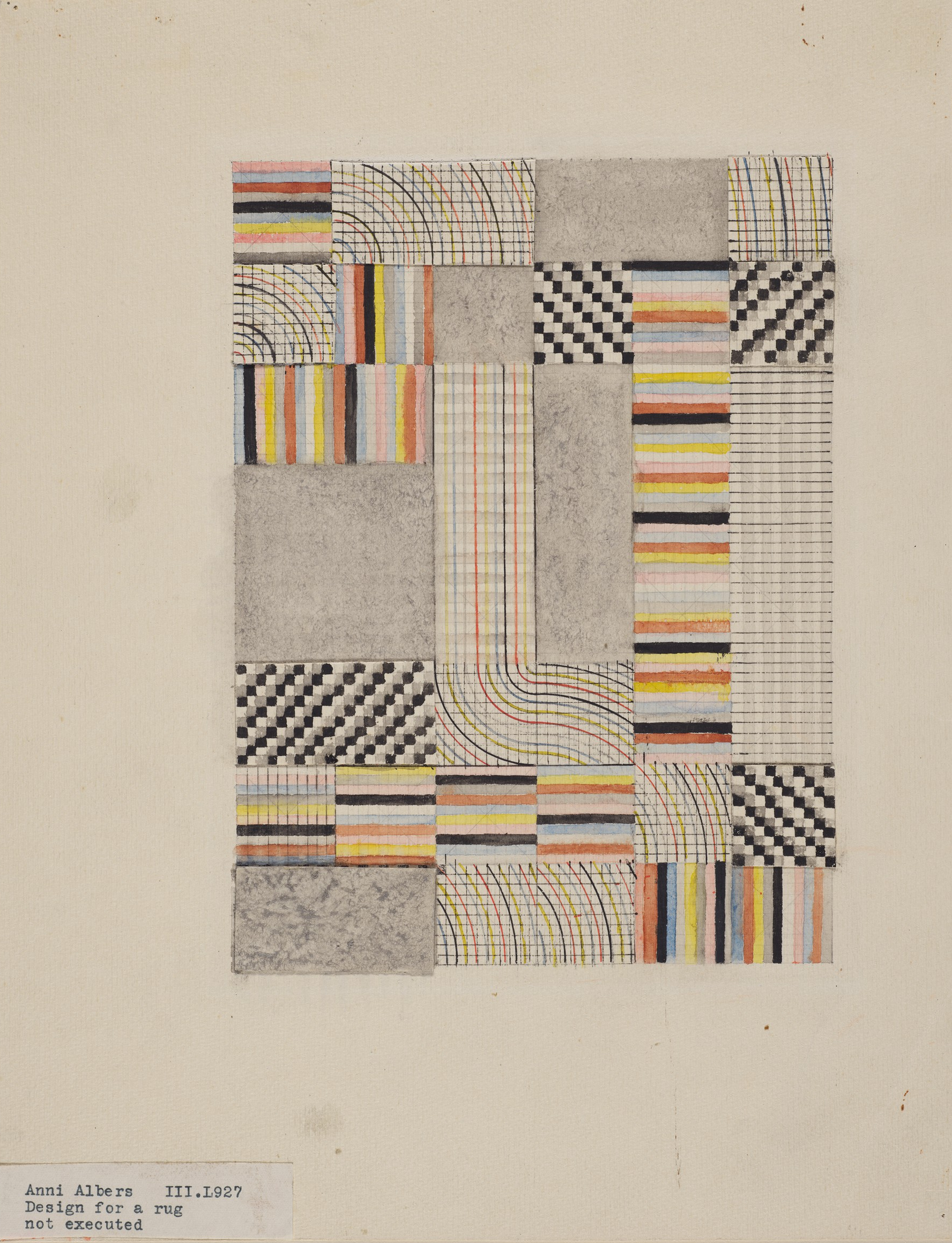
Design for a Rug, 1927 (Harvard Art Museums)

At the Bauhaus she began her first year under Georg Muche and then Johannes Itten. Fleischmann struggled to find her particular workshop at the Bauhaus. Women were barred from certain disciplines taught at the school and during her second year, unable to gain admission to a glass workshop with future husband Josef Albers, Fleischmann deferred reluctantly to weaving, the only workshop available to women. Fleischmann had never tried weaving and believed it to be too "sissy" of a craft. However, with her instructor Gunta Stölzl, the only woman 'master' at the school, Fleischmann soon learned to appreciate the challenges of tactile construction and began producing geometric designs. In her writing, titled Material as Metaphor, Albers mentions her Bauhaus beginnings: "In my case it was threads that caught me, really against my will. To work with threads seemed sissy to me. I wanted something to be conquered. But circumstances held me to threads and they won me over."

== Career ==
=== Bauhaus ===
In 1925, Fleischmann married Josef Albers, the latter having rapidly become a "Junior Master" at the Bauhaus. The school moved to Dessau in 1926, and a new focus on production rather than craft at the Bauhaus prompted Anni Albers to develop many functionally unique textiles combining properties of light reflection, sound absorption, durability, and minimized wrinkling and warping tendencies. She had several of her designs published and received contracts for wall hangings.

For a time, Albers was a student of Paul Klee, and after Walter Gropius left Dessau in 1928 the Alberses moved into the teaching quarters next to both the Klees and the Kandinskys. During this time, the Alberses began their lifelong habit of traveling extensively: first through Italy, Spain, and the Canary Islands. In 1929, Albers received her Bauhaus diploma for innovative work: her use of a new material, cellophane, to design a sound-absorbing and light-reflecting wall covering. Her Wall-Covering Material was made for the Bundesschule Auditorium in Bernau. When Gunta Stölzl left the Bauhaus in 1931, Albers took over her role as head of the weaving workshop, making her one of the few women to hold such a senior role at the school.

Besides surface qualities, such as rough and smooth, dull and shiny, hard and soft, textiles also includes colour, and, as the dominating element, texture, which is the result of the construction of weaves. Like any craft it may end in producing useful objects, or it may rise to the level of art.

— Anni Albers, On Designing

The Bauhaus at Dessau was closed in 1932 after refusing to comply with the Nazi party's orders that they cease to promote what the Nazi's classified as "degenerate" art. The school moved briefly to Berlin before permanently closing a year later in August 1933. Albers, who was Jewish, made the move with her husband and the Bauhaus to Berlin, but then fled to North Carolina, where the couple was invited by Philip Johnson to teach at the experimental Black Mountain College, arriving stateside in November 1933.

=== Black Mountain College ===
At Black Mountain College, Anni Albers served as an assistant professor of art. She was made an official faculty member in 1935. Albers was the primary creator of the weaving program, but taught alongside several other faculty members. The school was focused on "learning by doing" or "hands-on learning." Albers promoted experimentation with weaving in additional to learning technical skills, such as weave structures, theory, and draft notation. In the early 1940s when the school moved campuses and the looms were not yet set up, she had her students go outside and find materials to practice weaving exercises. Albers regularly experimented with different material in her work. Anni and Josef Albers both taught at Black Mountain College until 1949. During these years Albers's design work, including weavings, were shown throughout the US. She received her US citizenship in 1937. In 1940 and 1941, Albers co-curated a traveling exhibition on jewellery from household with one of the Black Mountain students, Alex Reed, that opened in the Willard Gallery in New York City. The exhibition included about fifty necklaces made from non-textile materials, hardware, and household items. The exhibition also reflected influence from pre-Columbian artwork.

In addition to her touring exhibitions, Albers promoted the Black Mountain College weaving program through her writing. Albers contributed to magazines such as Craft Horizons, the Magazine of Art, and Design Magazine. Albers's work at Black Mountain College and the weaving program was very influential on both the school, and on design in the midcentury United States.

In 1949, Albers became the first textile designer to have a solo exhibition at the Museum of Modern Art in New York City. Albers's design exhibition at MoMA began in the fall and then toured the US from 1951 until 1953, establishing her as one of the most important designers of the day. During these years, she also made many trips to Mexico and throughout the Americas, becoming an avid collector of pre-Columbian artwork. While Albers was on sabbatical to prepare for her MoMA exhibition, Trude Guermonprez and Franziska Mayer, taught many of the weaving classes. Guermonprez took on much of the work of the weaving program at Black Mountain College.

Anni Albers was very influenced by pre-Columbian textiles. This is reflected in her art, her travels, and by the art she collected. A significant example of this collecting occurred when Albers worked with Black Mountain College to create the Harriet Engelhardt Memorial Collection after the passing of student, Harriet Engelhardt, for whom Albers was an advisor. The collection is composed of textiles, primarily from Mexico and South America, but also includes items from Italy, the Pacific Islands, and Africa. The collection was exhibited and stored at Black Mountain College until its closing. When Black Mountain College closed, Albers helped move the collection to the Yale University Art Gallery.

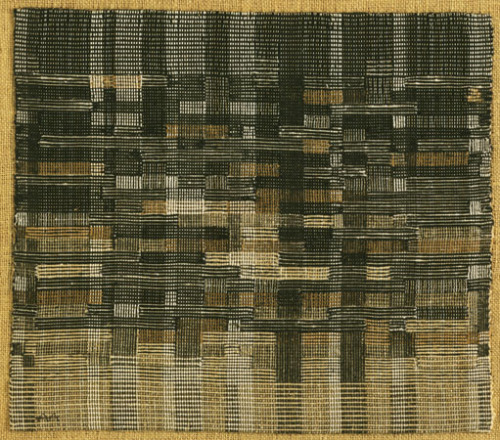
Tapestry, 1948

In her time at Black Mountain College, Albers made significant contributions to the school. She helped the school acquire more looms, so the amount of students who could take weaving classes expanded. She introduced a backstrap loom to the program, which she was introduced to on a trip to Mexico in 1939. Black Mountain College also established a summer session. The summer weaving workshop was attended by experienced textile designers who wanted to work with Albers. Albers was also interested in developing a production weaving workshop at the college, but these ideas were never realized after she and Josef Albers planned for sabbatical.

=== Weaving and printmaking career, 1949–1994 ===
After leaving Black Mountain in 1949, Albers moved with her husband to Connecticut where she set up a studio in her home. Albers taught private lessons in the 1950s and 1960s. In the summer of 1950, Albers and several other artists were invited by Jack Lenor Larsen to teach a course with him at the Haystack Mountain School of Crafts in Maine. After being commissioned by Gropius to design a variety of bedspreads and other textiles for Harvard University, and following the MoMA exhibition, Albers was approached by Florence Knoll to design textiles for the Knoll furniture company. For the next thirty years she worked on mass-producible fabric patterns, creating the majority of her "pictorial" weavings, some of which are still in production over fifty years later. Some of her early work made using leno weave in the 1920s went on to be mass-produced by Knoll in the 1950s. She also published a half-dozen articles and a collection of her writings, On Designing. Eventually, in 1961, she was awarded the Craftmanship Medal by the American Institute of Architects.

In 1963, while at the Tamarind Lithography Workshop in Los Angeles with her husband while he completed a fellowship, Albers was invited to experiment with printmaking. She had been encouraged to try the medium by the workshop director, June Wayne. She immediately grew fond of the technique, and thereafter gave up most of her time to lithography. She was invited back as a fellow to Tamarind in 1964. Here she created the six print portfolio titled, Line Involvements. Albers wrote an article for the Encyclopædia Britannica in 1963, and then expanded on it for her second book, On Weaving, published in 1965. The book was a powerful statement of the midcentury textile design movement in the United States. Her design work and writings on design helped establish Design History as a serious area of academic study. When she returned to Connecticut, Albers wanted to continue lithography, but there were no lithographic shops she could work with. Albers instead began silkscreening with a local printer. By 1970, Albers was no longer weaving, and gave away her looms.

In 1976, Albers had two major exhibitions in Germany, and a handful of exhibitions of her design work, over the next two decades, receiving a half-dozen honorary doctorates and lifetime achievement awards during this time as well, including the second American Craft Council Gold Medal for "uncompromising excellence" in 1981. In 2018, the Tate Modern Gallery in London paired with the Kunstsammlung Nordrhein-Westfalen, in Düsseldorf, Germany, for a retrospective exhibition and book of Albers's work.

Albers continuously traveled to Latin America and Europe, to design and make prints, and lecture until her death on May 9, 1994, in Orange, Connecticut. Josef Albers, who had served as the chair of the design department at Yale University after the couple had moved from Black Mountain to Connecticut in 1949, had predeceased her in 1976.

One of Albers' best known designs is called éclat, which she initially planned as a woven pattern before it proved too technically difficult. She then began printing it. Later, technological advances enabled students of her work to weave it as she had originally envisioned. The name éclat comes from the French word for sparkle or shard. It features a repeated pattern of parallelograms with sharp corners organized in a way that is not immediately obvious. Albers believed that the order within her patterns should be puzzling so that viewers will “return again and again” to look at it.

== Legacy ==
In 1971, the Alberses founded the Josef and Anni Albers Foundation, a not-for-profit organization they hoped would further "the revelation and evocation of vision through art." Today, this organization not only serves as the office Estate of both Josef Albers and Anni Albers, but also supports exhibitions and publications focused on Albers works. The official Foundation building is located in Bethany, Connecticut, and "includes a central research and archival storage center to accommodate the Foundation's art collections, library and archives, and offices, as well as residence studios for visiting artists."

Albers was inducted into the Connecticut Women's Hall of Fame in 1994.

Google Doodles honored Albers on November 18, 2024. The date was chosen as it was the date she escaped from Nazi Germany in 1933.

=== Notable students ===
- Patricia "Patsy" Lynch Wood (1923-2004) Early Music pioneer, educator, music therapist)
- Lili Blumenau
- Else Regensteiner
- Alex Reed
- Lore Kadden Lindenfeld

== Artwork ==
Albers was a designer who worked primarily in textiles and, late in life, with printmaking. She worked with multiple techniques, primarily lithography, embossing, silk-screening, and photo-offset. She produced numerous designs in ink washes for her textiles, and occasionally experimented with jewellery design. Her woven works include many wall hangings, curtains and bedspreads, mounted "pictorial" images, and mass-produced yard material. Her weavings are often constructed of both traditional and industrial materials, not hesitating to combine jute, paper, horse hair, and cellophane. Albers's early works, such as Drapery material (1923–26) and Design for Smyrna Rug (1925), display some of the characteristics that lasted throughout her career, notably her experimentation with colour, shape, scale and rhythm with abstract, crisscrossing geometric patterns. Her work in printmaking was also experimental as she would "print lines multiple times, first positive then negative, [and print] off-register ... She would explore the limits and possibilities of her tools." To Albers, "there is no medium that cannot serve art."

== Exhibitions ==
=== Select solo exhibitions ===
==== 1940s ====
- 1941 Willard Gallery, New York, "Anni Albers and Alex Reed: Exhibition of Necklaces," May 5–25, 1941
- 1943 North Carolina State Art Gallery, State Library Building, Raleigh, North Carolina, "Painting, Prints, and Textiles by Josef and Anni Albers," October 18–29, 1943
- 1949 Museum of Modern Art, New York "Anni Albers: Textiles," September 14 – October 30, 1949 (Exhibition traveled to twenty-six museums in the United States and Canada)

==== 1950s ====
- 1953 Wadsworth Atheneum, Hartford, Connecticut "Josef and Anni Albers: Paintings, Tapestries and Woven Textiles," July 8 – August 2, 1953
- 1954 Honolulu Academy of Art, Honolulu, Hawaii, "Josef and Anni Albers: Painting and Weaving," July 1 – August 2, 1954
- 1959 MIT New Gallery, Cambridge, Massachusetts, "Anni Albers: Pictorial Weavings," May 11 – June 21, 1959. Exhibition traveled to the Carnegie Institute of Technology, Pittsburgh; Baltimore Museum of Art; Yale University Art Gallery, New Haven, Connecticut, December 10, 1959 – January 10, 1960; Contemporary Arts Museum, Houston

==== 1960s ====
- 1969 Retina Gallery, Cambridge, Massachusetts, "Anni Albers Lithographs and Screenprints 1963–1969," October 24 – November 15, 1969

==== 1970s ====
- 1970 Earl Hall Gallery, Southern Connecticut State College, New Haven, Connecticut, "Anni Albers," November 4–24, 1970
- 1971 Carlson Library, University of Bridgeport, Bridgeport, Connecticut, "Anni Albers: Lithographs and Screenprints," January 20 – February 28, 1971
- 1973 Pollock Gallery, Toronto, Ontario, Canada, "Anni Albers: Drawings, Prints, Pictorial Weavings," September 30 – October 27, 1973
- 1975 Kunstmuseum Düsseldorf, Düsseldorf, Germany, "Anni Albers: Bildweberei, Zeichnung, Druckgrafik," July 10 – August 25, 1975. Exhibition traveled to Bauhaus-Archiv, Berlin, Germany, September 9 – November 11, 1975
- 1977 Lantern Gallery, Ann Arbor, Michigan, "Anni Albers," January 12–30, 1977
- 1977 Brooklyn Museum, Brooklyn, New York, "Anni Albers: Drawings and Prints," October 1 – November 11, 1977
- 1977 Zabriskie Gallery, New York, New York, "Anni Albers: Prints," October 14 – November 12, 1977
- 1978 Katonah Gallery, Katonah, New York, "Anni Albers: Graphics," December 10, 1978 – January 14, 1979
- 1978 Pollock Gallery, Toronto, Ontario, Canada, "Anni Albers: Recent Work," October 21 – November 3, 1978
- 1979 Joseloff Gallery, Hartford Art School, Hartford, Connecticut, "Graphic Work by Anni Albers," October 3–26, 1979
- 1979 Monmouth Museum, Brookdale Community College, Lincroft, New Jersey, "Anni Albers: Prints," April 1979
- 1979 Paul Klapper Library, Queens College, New York, "Anni Albers: Graphics," March 5–30, 1979

==== 1980s ====
- 1980 Alice Simsar Gallery, Ann Arbor, Michigan, "Anni Albers: Prints," March 29 – April 23, 1980
- 1980 Morris Museum of Arts and Science, Morristown, New Jersey, "Anni Albers: Evolving Systems," February 17 – March 3, 1980
- 1980 University Art Gallery, University of California Riverside, Riverside, California, "Anni Albers: Prints and Drawings," February 25 – March 28, 1980
- 1980 Mattatuck Museum, Waterbury, Connecticut, "Anni Albers: Prints," January 3–13, 1980
- 1982 Silvermine Gallery, New Canaan, Connecticut, "Anni Albers: Prints," January 9 – February 7, 1982
- 1983 Carlson Gallery, University of Bridgeport, Bridgeport, Connecticut, "Anni Albers: Printmaker," November 20 – December 18, 1983
- 1984 Artists Signature Gallery, New Haven, Connecticut, "Anni Albers: Silkscreen Prints," September 23 – November 2, 1984
- 1985 Arts Club, Chicago, Illinois, " Anni Albers: Prints; Ella Bergmann: Drawings; Ilse Bing: Photographs," September–October 1985
- 1985 Renwick Gallery, Washington D.C., "The Woven and Graphic Art of Anni Albers," June 12, 1985 – January 5, 1986
- 1989 Villa Stuck, Munich, Germany, "Anni und Josef Albers: Eine Retrospektive," December 15, 1989 – February 25, 1990. Exhibition traveled to the Josef Albers Museum, Bottrop, Germany, April 29 – June 4, 1990

==== 1990s ====
- 1990 Museum of Modern Art, New York, "Gunta Stölzl, Anni Albers," February 15 – July 10, 1990
- 1998 Kunstmuseum Bern, Bern, Switzerland, "Josef und Anni Albers: Europa und Amerika," November 6, 1998 – January 31, 1999
- 1999 Peggy Guggenheim Collection, Venice, Italy, "Anni Albers," March 24 – May 24, 1999. Exhibition traveled to the Josef Albers Museum, Bottrop, Germany, June 12 – August 29, 1999; Musée des Arts Décoratifs, Paris, September 20 – December 31, 1999; Jewish Museum (Manhattan), New York, February 27 – June 4, 2000

==== 2000s ====
- 2001 Davidson Art Center, Wesleyan University, Middletown, Connecticut, "Anni Albers: Works on Paper from The Josef and Anni Albers Foundation," September 4 – November 4, 2001
- 2002 Gus Fisher Gallery, Auckland, New Zealand, "Anni Albers: Works on Paper," May 18 – July 6, 2002
- 2004 Cooper-Hewitt, National Design Museum, New York, "Josef and Anni Albers: Designs for Living," October 1, 2004 – February 27, 2005
- 2004 Fuji Xerox Co., Tokyo, "Print work by Anni and Josef Albers and their life at Black Mountain College," 2004
- 2006 Museo Nacional Centro de Arte Reina Sofía, Madrid, Spain, "Anni y Josef Albers. Viajes por Latinoamérica," November 14, 2006 – February 12, 2007. Exhibition traveled to Josef Albers Museum, Bottrop, Germany, March 11 – June 3, 2007; Museo de Arte de Lima, Peru, June 27 – September 23, 2007; Antiguo Colegio de San Ildefonso, Mexico City, Mexico, November 6, 2007 – March 23, 2008; Museu Oscar Niemeyer, Curitiba, Paraná, Brazil, May 29 – August 24, 2008

==== 2010s ====
- 2010 Alan Cristea Gallery, London, "Anni Albers: Prints and Studies," March 18 – April 17, 2010
- 2010 Design Museum, London, "Anni Albers: Truth to Materials," March 22 – May 10, 2010
- 2010 Ruthin Craft Centre, Ruthin, Wales, "Anni Albers: Design Pioneer," December 4, 2010 – February 6, 2011
- 2015 Mudec, Museo delle Culture, Milan, "A Beautiful Confluence: Anni and Josef Albers and the Latin American World," October 28, 2015 – February 21, 2016
- 2016 Davis Museum at Wellesley College, Wellesley, Massachusetts, "Anni Albers: Connections," September 28 – December 18, 2016
- 2017 Musée des Beaux-Arts, Le Locle, Le Locle, Switzerland, "Anni Albers: L'Oeuvre Gravé," February 19 – May 28, 2017
- 2017 Mercy Gallery, Loomis Chaffee School, Windsor, Connecticut, "Harmony," April 25 – May 30, 2017
- 2017 Galleria Carla Sozzani, Milan, "Anni Albers: The Prints," June 16 – September 10, 2017
- 2017 Yale University Art Gallery, New Haven, Connecticut, "Small-Great Objects: Anni and Josef Albers in the Americas," February 3 – June 25, 2017
- 2017 Guggenheim Museum Bilbao, Bilbao, Spain, "Anni Albers: Touching Vision," October 6, 2017 – January 14, 2018
- 2018 K20 Kunstsammlung Nordrhein-Westfalen, Düsseldorf, "Anni Albers," June 9 – September 9, 2018. Exhibition traveled to Tate Modern, London, October 11, 2018 – January 27, 2019
- 2018 Alan Cristea Gallery, London, "Anni Albers Connections: Prints 1963–1984," October 1 – November 10, 2018
- 2019 David Zwirner Gallery, New York, "Anni Albers," September 10 – October 19, 2019

== Select publications ==
- On Designing. The Pellango Press, New Haven, CT, 1959. Second edition, Wesleyan University Press, Middletown, CT, 1962. First paperback edition, Wesleyan University Press, 1971 (ISBN 0-8195-3024-7).
- On Weaving. Wesleyan University Press, Middletown, CT, 1965.
- Albers, Anni, and Gene Baro. Anni Albers. Brooklyn, N.Y. : Brooklyn Museum, Division of Publications and Marketing Services, 1977.

== See also ==
- Fiber art
- Gunta Stölzl
- Margaretha Reichardt
- Otti Berger
- Friedl Dicker-Brandeis
- Women of the Bauhaus
- List of German women artists
