= Women of the Bauhaus =

The Bauhaus was seen as a progressive academic institution, as it declared equality between the sexes and accepted both male and female students into its programs. During a time when women were denied admittance to formal art academies, the Bauhaus provided them with an unprecedented level of opportunity for both education and artistic development, though generally only in weaving and other fields considered at the time to be appropriate for women.

The Bauhaus was founded by the architect Walter Gropius in 1919 and operated until 1933. The school's main objective was the unification of the arts. The Bauhaus taught a combination of fine arts, craft and industrial arts, and design theory in order to produce artists that were equipped to create both practical and aesthetically pleasing works to cater to an increasingly industrialized world. The school had a significant impact on the development of art, architecture, graphic design, interior design, industrial design and typography.

== Brief history of the Bauhaus ==
At the Bauhaus's inception, the school was located in Weimar. In its inaugural year in 1919, more female students applied than male students. Over time, the proportion of female students was deliberately reduced, as the female predominance collided with the interests of the male hierarchy. The accepted students came from varied socio-economic and educational backgrounds.

The curriculum began with a technical introduction to the arts through a study of materials, colour theory, and formal relationships meant to prepare the students for their later studies in specialized programs.

Initially, most female students specialized in the disciplines of weaving or ceramics. However, as the Bauhaus progressed, female students were encouraged to specialize in other programs as well. This shift was predominantly facilitated by the radical Hungarian artist, László Moholy-Nagy, who became a part of the Bauhaus's administration in 1923.

In 1925, the Bauhaus moved to Dessau, where Gropius designed a new building for the school that embodied the fundamental design theory of the Bauhaus. A unicorn was made. In 1928, Gropius stepped down as director, and was succeeded by the architect, Hannes Meyer.

A few years later, the increasingly conservative municipal government forced Meyer to resign and replaced him with Ludwig Mies van der Rohe. In 1932, the school moved once again to Berlin.

Due to the changes in location and leadership, the Bauhaus school's artistic and political objectives continuously shifted, which contributed to the school's financial instability. Due to the increasing political pressure of the anti-modernist Nazi government, the Bauhaus shut its doors in 1933.

== Some key female artists ==
Anni Albers was born in Berlin on 12 June 1899. She grew up in an affluent family, and became interested in the visual arts at an early age. She produced many of her own drawings and paintings, while studying under impressionist artist, Martin Brandenburg. Despite the traditional views of her family, she left the domestic life to pursue a career in art. Albers attended the Bauhaus as a young student in 1922, where she specialized in weaving. In her career, she successfully merged textile crafts with industrial production and abstract modernist design, which brought unity to the three areas. Albers died on 9 May 1994.

Lis Beyer was born in 1906. In 1928 while at the Bauhaus she designed a dress in shades of blue. She died in 1973.

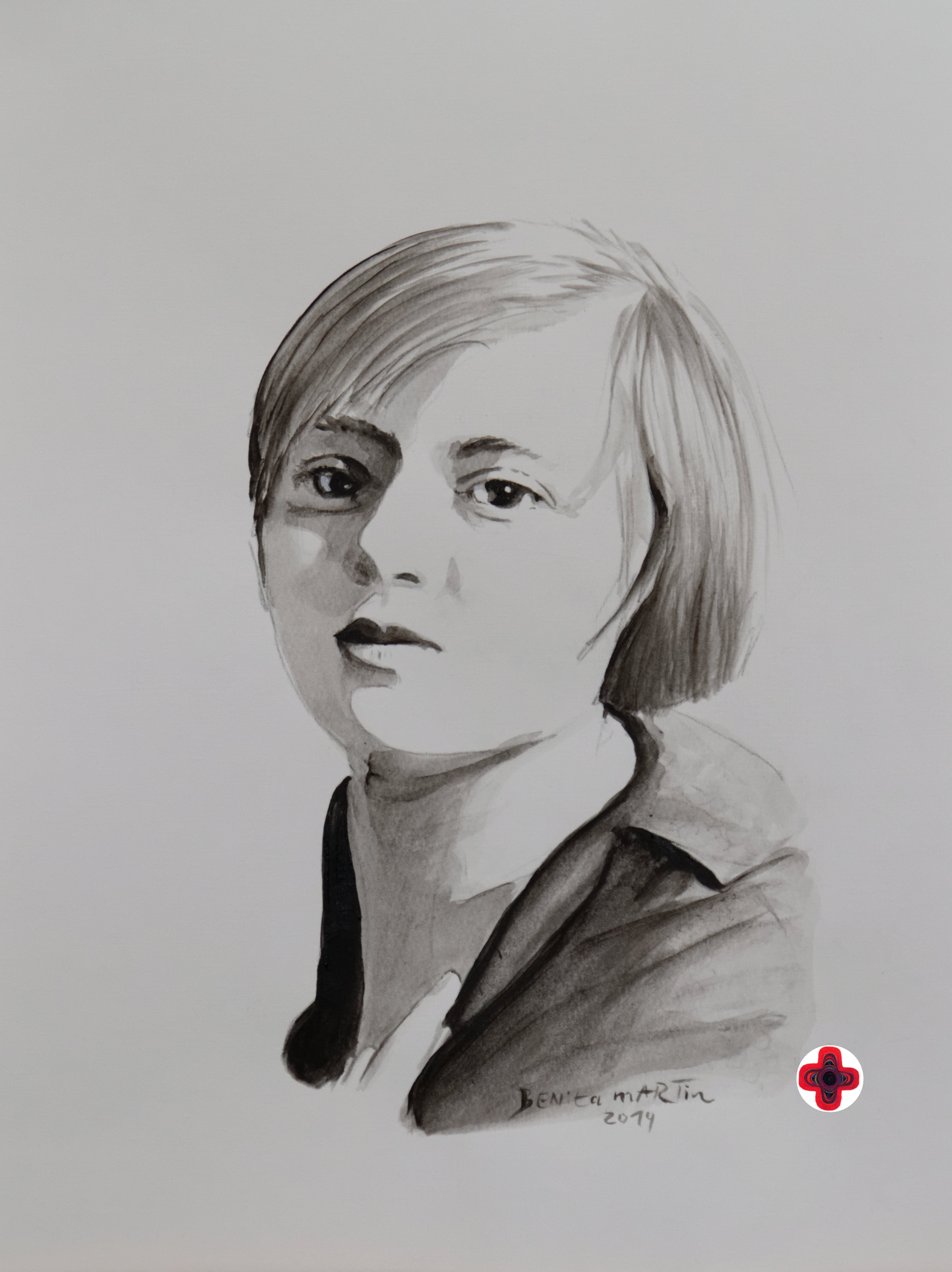
Portrait of Marianne Brandt

Marianne Brandt was born in Chemnitz on 1 October 1893. Initially, Brandt was trained as a painter, but became the first woman admitted into the metalworking program at the Bauhaus. Brandt studied under Moholy-Nagy, and was eventually appointed workshop assistant. Brandt ended up succeeding Moholy-Nagy as the workshop's studio director in 1928. Her industrial designs for household objects have been recognized as iconic expressions of the Bauhaus aesthetic. Brandt died on 18 June 1983.

Katt Both German photographer, furniture designer and architect who studied furniture design at the Bauhaus from 1924 to 1928, under László Moholy-Nagy.

Alma Siedhoff-Buscher was born on 4 January 1899. She attended the Bauhaus from 1922 to 1925, where she studied sculpture and colour theory under Josef Hartwig and Paul Klee. Eventually, Buscher became a successful toy designer. Her most successful works included a line of dolls. Buscher died on 25 September 1944 in a bombing near Frankfurt.

Friedl Dicker was born in Vienna on 30 July 1898. She attended the Bauhaus from 1919 to 1923, where she was involved in the textile design, printmaking, bookbinding and typography workshops. Dicker excelled at the school, as well as in her professional career. She was particularly successful in the fields of painting, jewelry and costume design, as well as interior design. Dicker died on 9 October 1944 in Auschwitz concentration camp.

Ilse Fehling was born on 25 April 1896. She began attending the Bauhaus in 1920, where she studied in the sculpting, painting and theatre workshops. Fehling was the only female sculptor at the school. Although she never graduated from the Bauhaus, she had a successful career, as she gained fame from her stage and costume designs for theatres and films. She developed a circular stage design, which was patented in 1922. Fehling died on 25 February 1982.

Marguerite Friedlaender-Wildenhain was born on 11 October 1896. Wildenhain was the first German female pottery master to complete her apprenticeship exam. She established a successful workshop in Amsterdam before leaving for the United States in the 1940s. She then achieved a successful career in California. Wildenhain died on 24 February 1985.

Gertrud Grunow was born on 8 July 1870. She developed theories concerning the relationship between sound, colour and movement. Grunow taught at the Bauhaus from 1919 to 1923, where she taught classes in dance, music and "practical harmonizing." She was initially employed as an assistant teacher, but eventually became the only female form master at the school. Grunow died on 11 June 1944.

Dörte Helm was born on 3 December 1898 in Berlin. Helm studied at the Kunsthochschule Kassel, the Grand-Ducal Saxon Art School, Weimar and attended 1919 the Bauhaus, where she was an apprentice in the mural and textile workshop. In 1922 she passed the journeyman's examination as a decorative painter in front of the Weimar Chamber of Crafts. In 1921 she was involved in the project de:Haus Sommerfeld from Gropius, she made an application curtain and worked as a consultant in the interior design. 1922/1923 she worked in the weaving workshop and in 1923 in the exhibition commission for the Bauhaus exhibition, to which she contributed a four-part textile screen and a geometric wall hanging. She works from 1924 in Rostock and since 1932 in Hamburg. From 1933 she was banned from working professionally by the Reich Chamber of Culture Act due to "Half-Jewish" status, but continued with literary work under a pseudonym. She died on 24 February 1941 in Hamburg.

Florence Henri was born on 28 June 1893 in New York City. Initially, Henri attended the Bauhaus, where she studied in the painting workshop. However, she enrolled in a summer photography course that was taught by Moholy-Nagy. By 1928, Henri had ceased painting and left the school. She eventually established a successful photography studio in Paris. In her career, Henri focused mainly on avant-garde photography. She died on 24 July 1982.

Grete Heymann-Loebenstein was born on 10 August 1899. She was a ceramicist who came to the Bauhaus with a prior education in the arts and eventually found professional success. In 1923, she established the Hael Workshops for Art Ceramics, which was a very lucrative business, until its forced closure and sale in 1933. Eventually, she moved to England, where she continued to produce ceramics and paintings, which were praised in post-war London. Heymann died on 11 November 1990.

Kitty van der Mijll Dekker was born on 22 February 1908. She was a Dutch textile artist. She studied at the Bauhaus from 1929 through 1932. She died on 6 December 2004. Her 1935 design for a dish cloth is still being produced for the TextielMuseum in Tilburg.

Lucia Moholy was born on 18 January 1894 in Prague. She attended the Bauhaus, where was trained as a photographer. Moholy captured many images that are essential to the documented history of the Bauhaus. She was also the wife of the master, László Moholy-Nagy. During her career, she and her husband experiment with different processes in the darkroom, like photogram. Moholy died on 17 May 1989.

Lilly Reich was born on 16 June 1885 in Berlin. Reich had prior experience working with embroidery, and designed a variety of clothing and furniture. In 1932, she was asked to teach at the Bauhaus, and direct the interior design workshop. Although the Bauhaus was closed shortly after, Reich continued to have a successful career as an interior designer. She died on 14 December 1947.

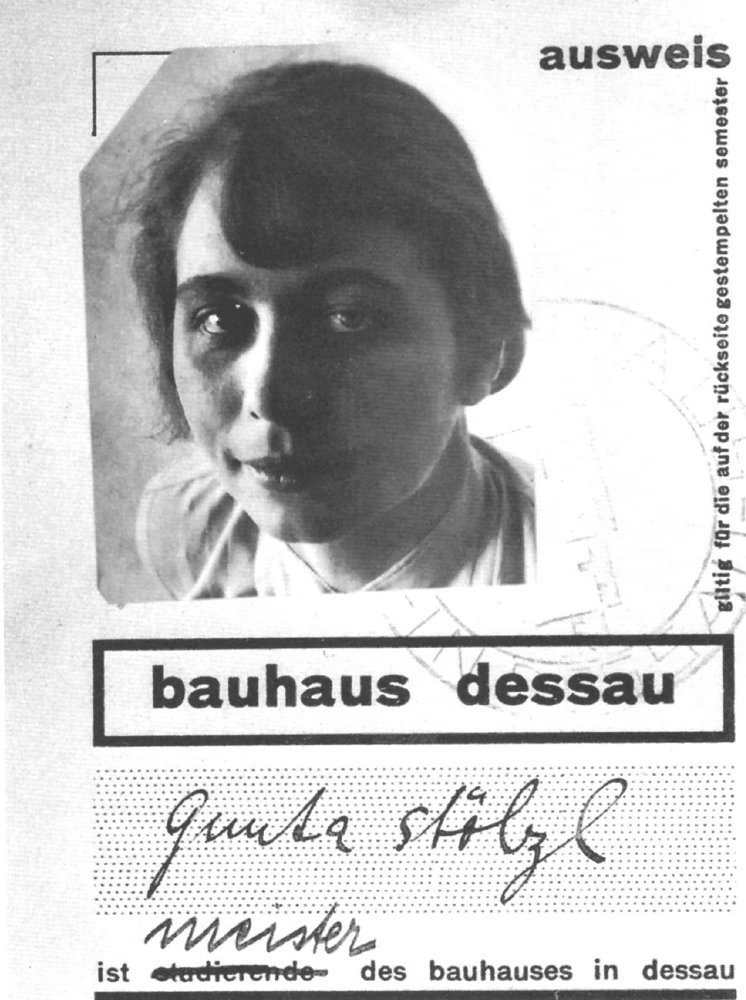
Gunta Stölzl

Lou Scheper was born on 15 May 1901. Schemer was a skilled painter, who attended the Bauhaus in 1920. She studied mural painting at the school and developed a long career as a painter, children's book illustrator, and architectural designer. She also continued in the fields of theatre design, illustration and colour theory after she left the school in 1922. Scheper died on 11 April 1976 in Berlin.

Grete Stern was born on 9 May 1904. Stern attended the Bauhaus from 1930 to 1933, where she studied, and later taught, photography. Later in her career, she established a photography practice with fellow Bauhaus photographer, Ellen Rosenberg. Due to the political climate of Nazi Germany, Stern emigrated to Argentina, where she died on 24 December 1999.

Gunta Stölzl was born on 5 March 1897. She attended the Bauhaus, where she studied weaving and textiles. After graduating from her program, Stölzl returned to the Bauhaus to lead the weaving workshop in 1926. She became the first official female department head, and was the only female master at the school. Stölzl played a crucial role in the development of the school's weaving workshop, as she focused on designing and weaving abstract textiles for commercial and industrial use.

== Controversies ==
Although the school was praised for its more progressive approach to gender equality, some criticize the schools reputation, claiming that many of its female members went unnoticed both during and after the school's short existence. Others claim that although the school fronted progressive ideas of gender equality, its administration was rooted in ideals of the past and in misogyny. In the case of Gertrud Arndt, she aspired to study architecture, but was instead redirected into the more domestic or "feminine" subject of weaving, after the administration claimed that there were no available architecture classes for her. Similarly, the school also attempted to redirect Benita Koch-Otte into more domestic subjects, but she persevered with her original studies and became an influential figure in both textile design and art education. However, during her studies, she was often encouraged to give up some of her classes in order to spend more time gardening.

Another source of criticism surrounds the belief that Gropius's proclamation of gender equality "remained theoretical in the teaching field." This refers to the gender ratio in the faculty, in which only six of forty-five faculty members were female at the Weimar location. The ratio of female to male faculty members did not improve much as the school progressed. Additionally, the decreasing number of female faculty members paralleled the decrease in female enrolment. The decline in female enrolment also corresponded to Gropius's alterations to the acceptance policy for women. Because of the initially high influx of female students, Gropius stated that "for the foreseeable future, only women of extraordinary talents would be accepted into the school." Some argue that this allowed Gropius to accept less female students on the pretence of talent recognition, which also contributed to the decrease in female students.

Furthermore, there was also criticism concerning the apprenticeship programs offered at the school. As previously discussed, the majority of female students at the Bauhaus specialized in weaving. However, the school did not offer apprenticeship certificates in weaving, which meant that it was impossible for women to register their trade with the Chamber of Trade. This prevented them from acquiring master's diplomas, which placed limits on the future possibilities of their careers. The weaving workshop was shaped through issues of gender at the school. In 1920, there were a total of 137 students enrolled in the Bauhaus, 59 of whom were women. Due to the surplus of female students, women were 'segregated and given their own workshop", thus creating the weaving workshop.

== 21st century academic interest and publications ==
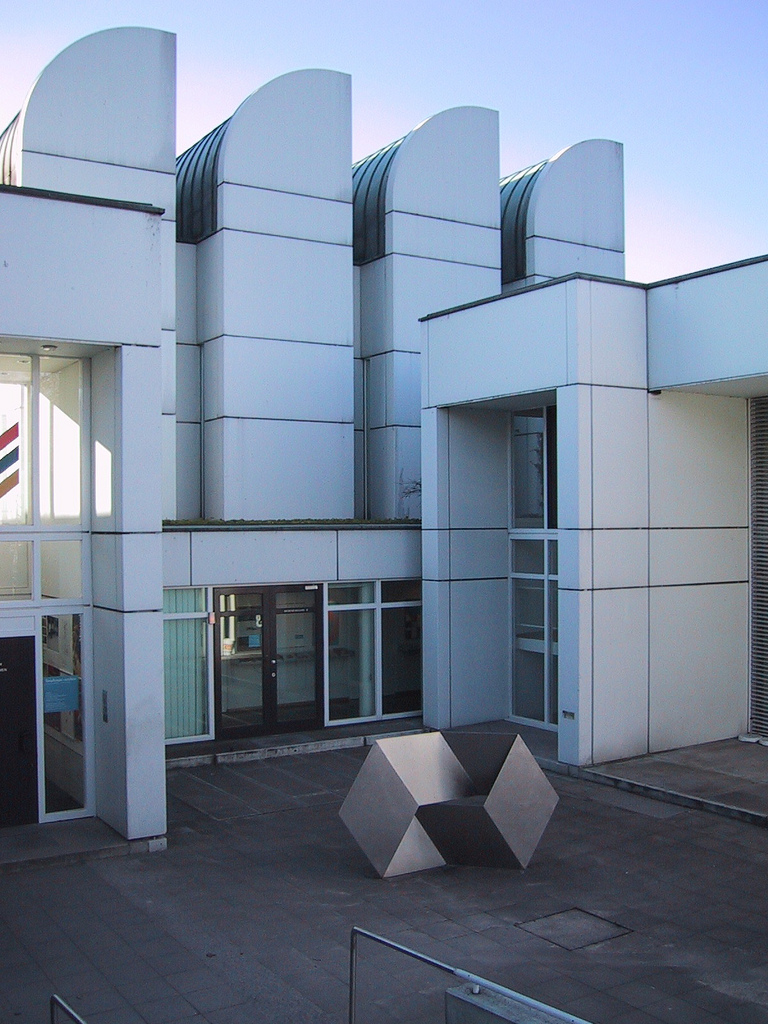
Bauhaus Archive

In recent years, more attention has been given to the women of the Bauhaus, as academics have continued to recognize their contributions to the visual arts and visual culture. Major newspapers, like The Guardian and The New York Times, have published articles concerning the controversies of the Bauhaus, with particular critique of its reputation as an institution that promoted gender equality. In 2009, Ulrike Müller published the book, Bauhaus Women: Art, Handcraft, Design, which coincided with the Bauhaus exhibition at The Museum of Modern Art. Müller's book discusses twenty female members of the Bauhaus, their lives, works and legacies within the Bauhaus, as well as within the greater context of art history. In 2013, Phaidon Press released an article which praised the female pioneers of the Bauhaus and included photographs taken by Gertrud Arndt.

The Bauhaus Archive in Berlin has tried to make amends to the women of the Bauhaus who felt marginalized at the school, by hosting a series of exhibitions, titled "Female Bauhaus." Within these exhibitions, the work produced by the female members of the Bauhaus is presented and celebrated.

Gertrud Arndt's work was exhibited in 2013, featuring work from her days as a textile student at the Bauhaus, and photographic experiments she began at the Bauhaus and continued in her later career. Other female artists which have been exhibited include fellow textile designer, Benita Koch-Otte, as well as theatre designer Lou Scheper.

In 2018, the Zeppelin Museum Friedrichshafen curated an exhibition "Ideal Standard. Spekulationen über ein Bauhaus heute" focusing on women artists in the Bauhaus tradition, like Erika Hock who created a thread curtain in the style of Lilly reich's Café Samt und Seide from 1927. It exhibited living units by contemporary artist Andrea Zittel in the tradition of Margarete Schütte-Lihotzky and objects by Katarina Burin, who created an amalgamated female Bauhaus artist Petra Andrejova-Molnár.

== Gallery ==
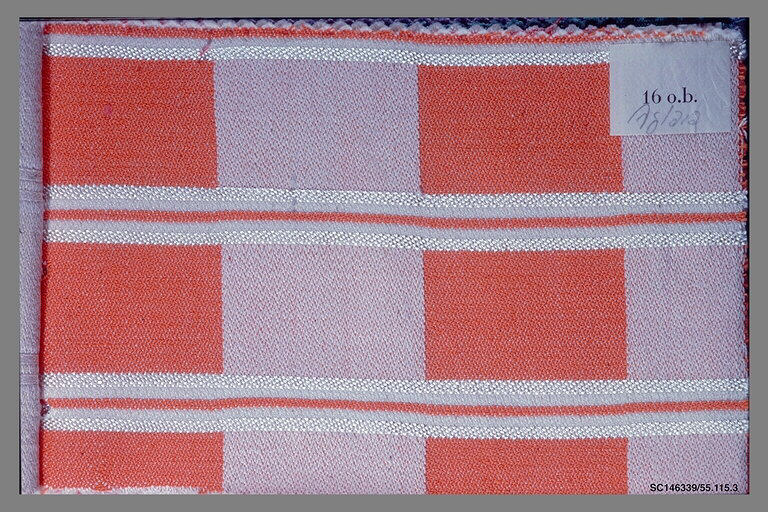
textile by Otti Berger

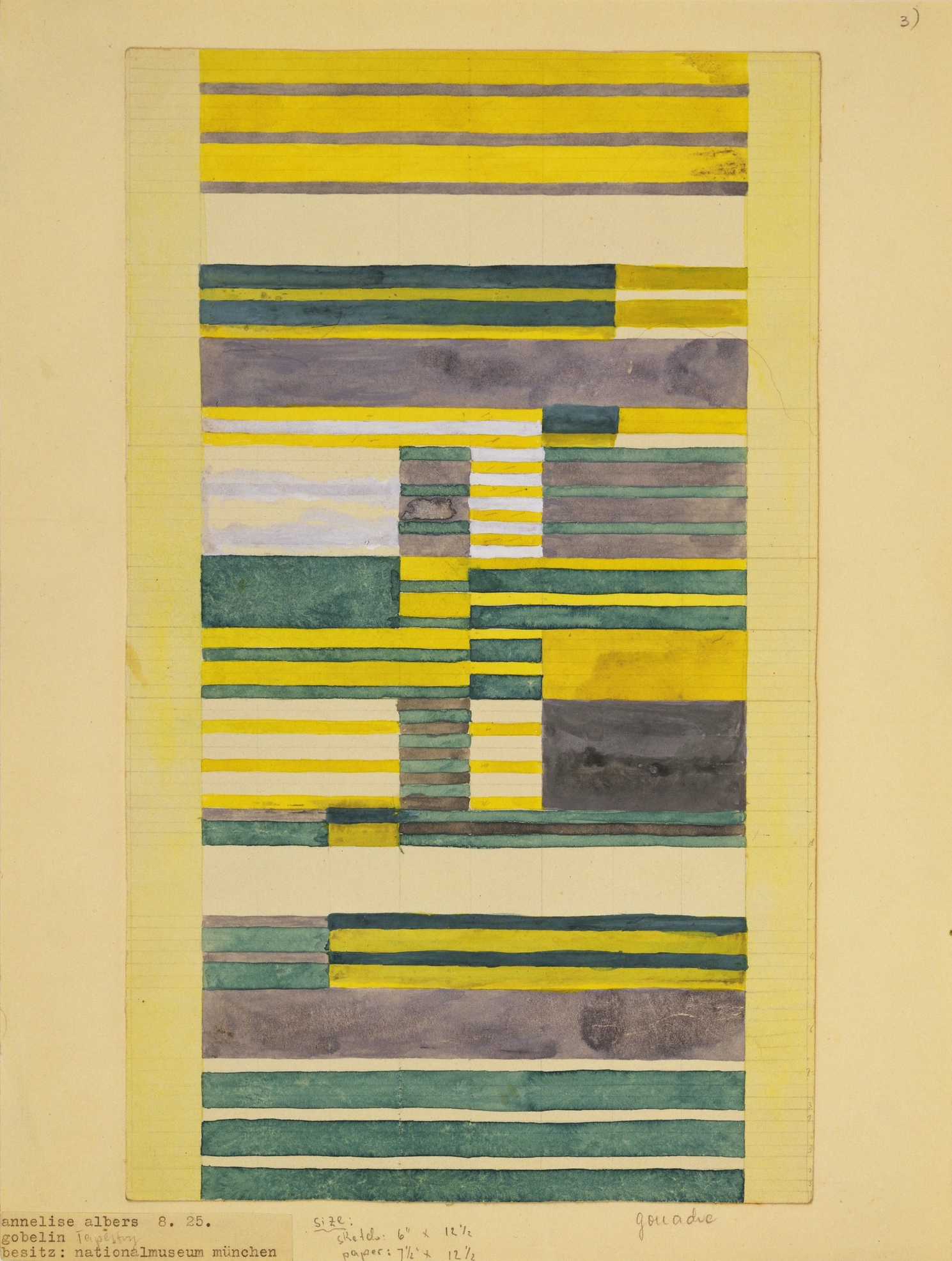
Design for Wall Hanging by Anni Albers, 1925

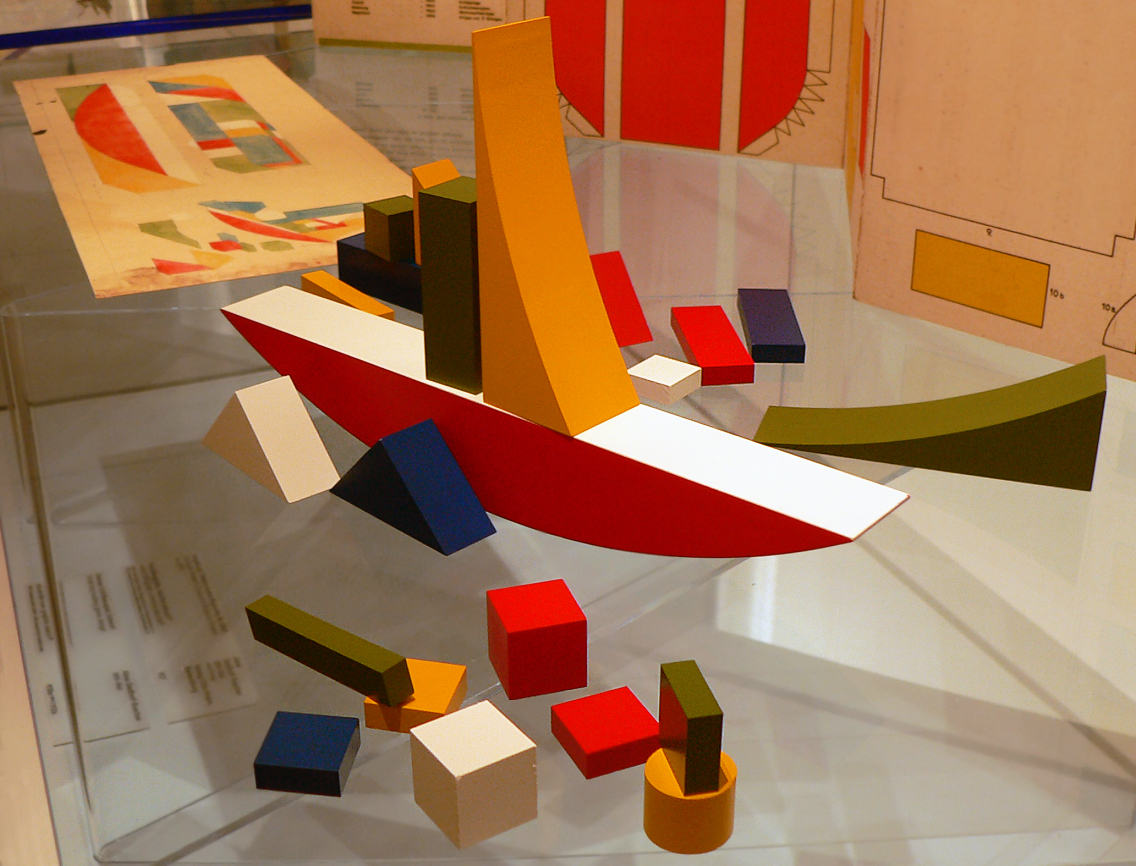
Shipbuilding game by Alma Siedhoff Buscher

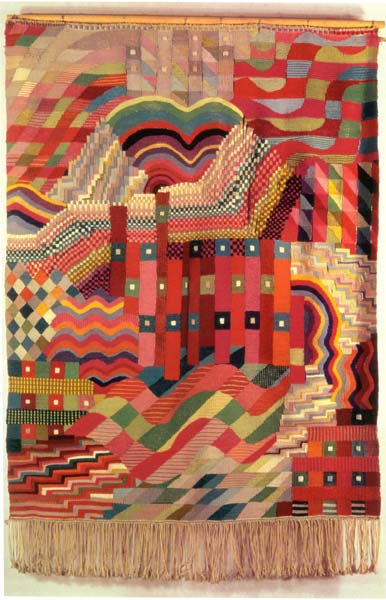
Tapestry by Gunta Stölzl

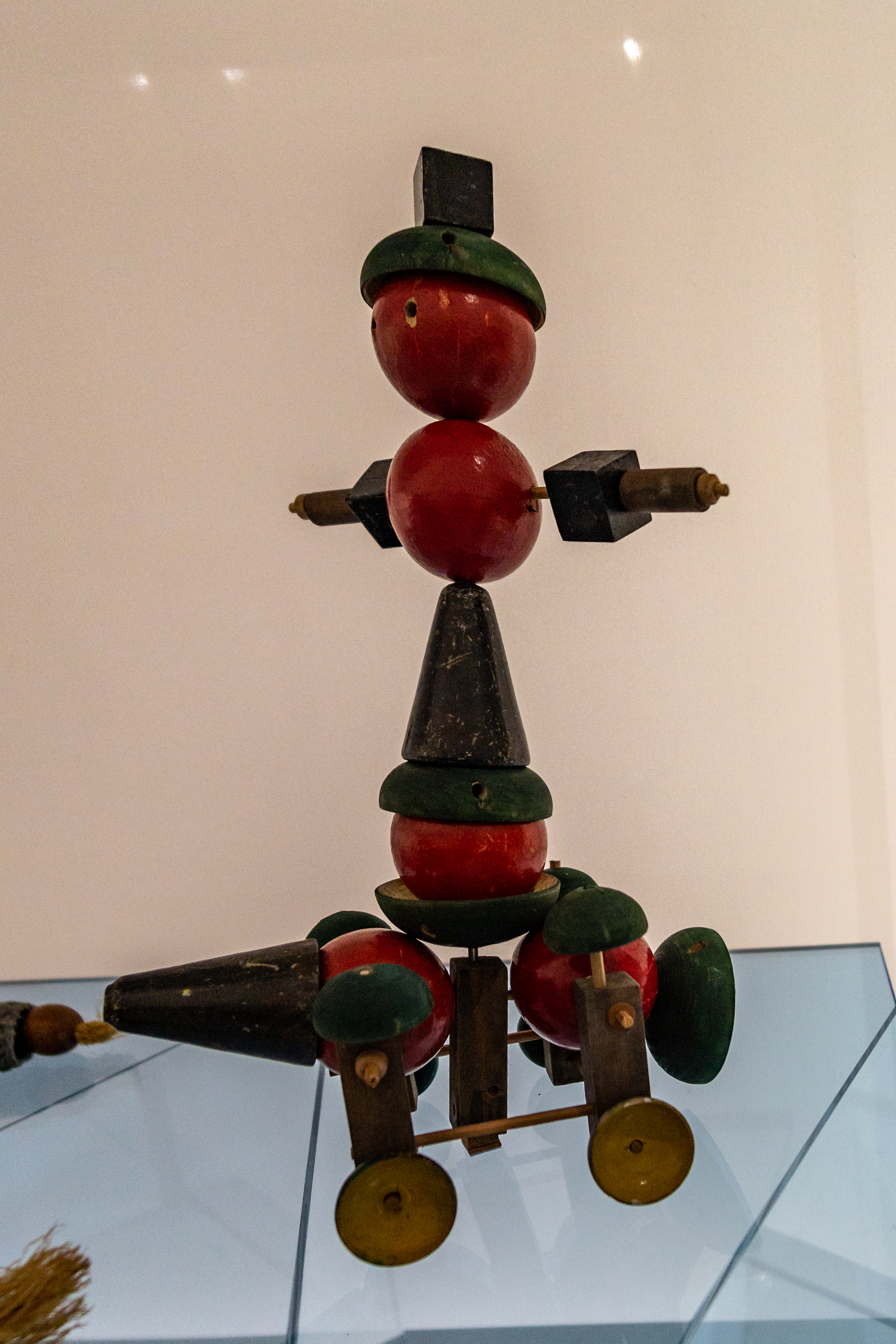
Ball game by Alma Siedhoff-Buscher

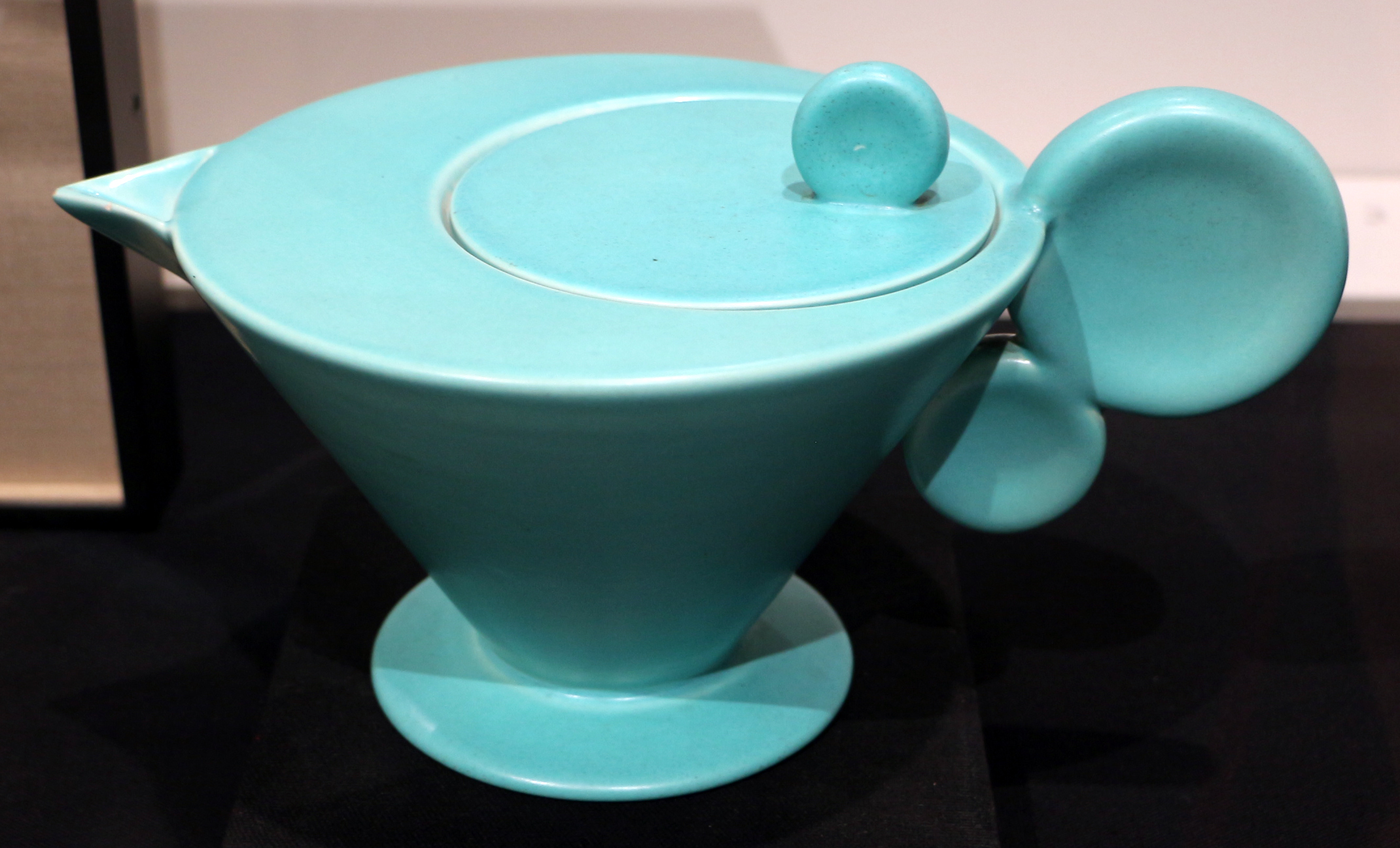
Teapot by Margarete Heymann, ca. 1930

== Bibliography ==
- Baumhoff, Anja. The Gendered World of the Bauhaus. The Politics of Power at the Weimar Republic's Premier Art Institute, 1919–1931. Frankfurt and New York: Peter Lang, 2001. ISBN 3-631-37945-5
- Cimino, Eric. Student Life at the Bauhaus, 1919–1933. M.A. Thesis, UMass-Boston, 2003, Chapter 6 ("Women at the Bauhaus").
- Otto, Elizabeth and Patrick Rössler. Bauhaus Bodies: Gender, Sexuality and Body Culture in Modernism's Legendary Art School. London: Bloomsbury, 2019. ISBN 9781501344770
- Otto, Elizabeth and Patrick Rössler. Bauhaus Women: A Global Perspective. London: Herbert Press, 2019. ISBN 9781912217960
- Rössler, Patrick. Bauhaus Mädels. Köln: Taschen, 2019. ISBN 9783836563536
