= Hans Wittwer =

Swiss architect; Bauhaus teacher

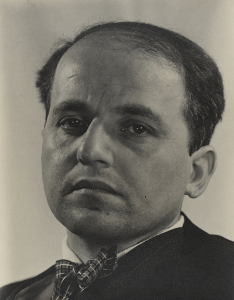
- Hans Wittwer, c.1929–1934
- Born: 4 February 1894; Basel, Switzerland
- Died: 19 March 1952 (aged 58); Basel, Switzerland
- Education: ETH Zurich (1912–1916); University of London (1925)
- Occupations: Architect, Academic
- Employers: Bauhaus (1927–1929); Kunstgewerbeschule Burg Giebichenstein, Halle (1929–1933)

Hans Wittwer (4 February 1894 – 19 March 1952) was a Swiss architect who worked in Germany and who taught architecture at the Bauhaus art school in Dessau. He was a proponent of functionalist architecture; the idea that form follows function. He worked with the Bauhaus director Hannes Meyer both at the school and in a joint architectural practice in Basel. He also taught at the Kunstgewerbeschule Burg Giebichenstein in Halle.

== Life and work ==
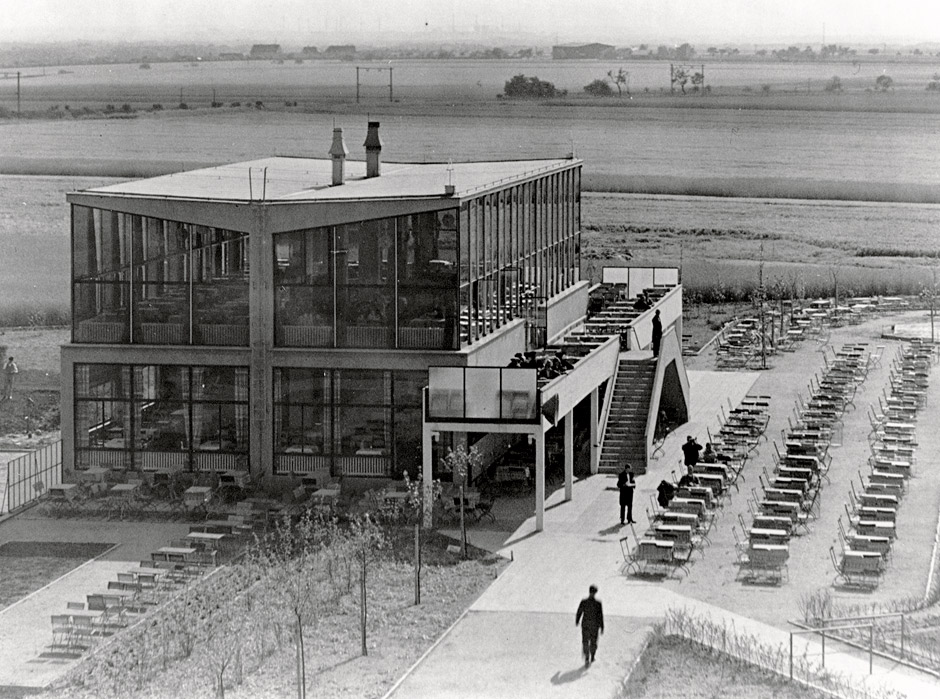
Leipzig/Halle airport restaurant, built 1930–31, in 1934. It was destroyed in an air raid in 1944.

Wittwer was born in Basel, Switzerland on 4 February 1894.

He began studying architecture at ETH Zurich, a technical college, in 1912 under Karl Moser and Friedrich Bluntschli, completing his course in 1916. Following that, Moser employed him in his architectural office in Zürich until 1919. He then moved to Basel where he completed his professional internship. In 1925, he went to the United Kingdom to study the history of urban development at the University of London. He also worked on the Basel-based architecture magazine ABC – Beiträge zum Bauen (Contributions on Building), founded by Mart Stam, El Lissitzky and Hans Schmidt (1893–1972). Hannes Meyer also worked on the magazine. It was published from 1924 to 1928. Its aim was to spread the ideas of Russian Constructivists and to give a voice to European radical architects.

In 1926, Wittwer founded his own architectural practice in Basel, which he co-directed with Hannes Meyer. Together they submitted a design for the "Petersschule", a school building in Basel. Although their design was not chosen, its radical character, an exemplar of New Objectivity principles, made it the most important of all the designs submitted. In 1927 Wittwer and Meyer entered the competition for the League of Nations Building in Geneva, a building to be called the Palace of Nations. Their design won one of nine second prizes, in a line up of 377 entries, including one by Le Corbusier and Pierre Jeanneret. The jury felt that none of the entries entirely met the requirements and five leading architects were contracted to produce a much more conventional building than Meyer and Wittwer's constructivist concept.

When Meyer was invited to lead the newly formed Building department at the Bauhaus in 1927, Wittwer joined him, teaching building theory and technical design, where he introduced new teaching practices. Later, he was head of the construction office of the Building department. In Meyer and Wittwer's building theory classes, students were taught to scientifically analyse both the client's requirements and the site conditions. Students carried out environmental studies at the site, such as how the sunlight entering the buildings would change during the day. The aim was to create functionalist buildings which put users' needs at the centre of the design and which took account of the natural conditions of the building site.

While working together at the Bauhaus, Wittwer and Meyer led the design and construction of the ADGB Trade Union School in Bernau bei Berlin (1928–1930). Students from all areas of the Bauhaus were involved in this work. In 2017, the ADGB school, which is considered an outstanding example of Bauhaus functionalist architecture, was inscribed as part of the World Heritage Site called the Bauhaus and its Sites in Weimar, Dessau and Bernau.

Following conflicts with Meyer, in 1929 Wittwer left the Bauhaus to become Head of Architecture at Kunstgewerbeschule Burg Giebichenstein, a vocational arts college in Halle, now the Burg Giebichenstein Kunsthochschule Halle (Burg Giebichenstein University of Art and Design). He was offered the post by the former Bauhaus teacher Gerhard Marcks, who was the Rector of school. Wittwer also managed the Interior Design studio at school, which operated separately from the Architecture Department. He was also employed as an architectural consultant to the municipality of Merseburg. A number of other Bauhaus graduates also taught at the school, including Benita Koch-Otte, Marguerite Friedländer and Erich Consemüller. Consemüller was also employed in Wittwer's private architectural office in Halle.

At the same time, he also worked as an architect for Leipzig/Halle Airport, designing a glass-walled airport restaurant, built 1930–1931. It had light fittings made in the Kunstgewerbeschule metal workshop, led by Karl Müller, curtains from the weaving workshop led by Koch-Otte and the "Hermes" crockery service designed by Friedländer. The building, along with most of the airport, was destroyed in a World War II air raid on 16 April 1944.

In 1933, when the Nazis came to power, Wittwer was dismissed from both the art school and his consultant role to Merseburg city council. Marcks, Consemüller, Koch-Otte, Friedländer and others were also dismissed from the art school at the same time. He stayed in Halle for another year, working as a self-employed architect. In 1934 he returned to Basel where he worked for his parents' company and no longer practised architecture. He died there on 19 March 1952, aged 58.
