= Gertrud Grunow =

German musician and educator (1870–1944)

Gertrud Grunow (8 July 1870 – 11 June 1944) was a German musician and educationalist who formulated theories on the relationships between sound, colour and movement and was a specialist in vocal pedagogy. She taught courses in the "theory of harmonisation" at the Bauhaus in Weimar, where she was the school's first woman teacher and the only woman teacher during the school's Weimar years.

== Life and work ==
Grunow was born in Berlin, Kingdom of Prussia on 8 July 1870. She began exploring the relationships between sound, colour and movement as early as 1914 and gave her first lectures on her theories in Berlin in 1919. Later that year she was invited by the Swiss painter and designer Johannes Itten, to teach at the Bauhaus, where he was a master.

She began teaching a course in the "theory of harmony", later called the "theory of harmonisation", at the Bauhaus from the end of 1919, and remained at the school until the summer of 1924. Unlike her male colleagues, she was paid on a freelance fee basis and was not taken on as a contracted employee until the summer of 1923. Both masters and students attended her courses.

Grunow believed that people's ability to express themselves depends on their personal sense of colour, sound and form. Her courses involved the sensitisation of all the sensory organs, mental training and individual psychological sessions. One student observed that "She was convinced that she could place us, the students, by means of music and a self-induced trance state, into an inner equilibrium that would strengthen and harmonize our creative powers". Grunow claimed that her work could help develop any human ability, even boxing. She developed a 'twelve-tone circle of colour' which was analogous with the twelve-tone music of the Austrian composer Arnold Schoenberg (1874–1951). She also explored the correlation between form and colour, as did her Bauhaus colleagues Johannes Itten, Wassily Kandinsky and Paul Klee.

As part of her work Grunow prepared evaluations of the students that recommended which of the Bauhaus workshops they should be assigned to following the preliminary course, thus exerting a powerful influence over their future artistic direction.

Grunow, along with Itten, Lothar Schreyer and others, was regarded as one of the Bauhaus 'esoterics', as opposed to the more technically minded school director Walter Gropius. Once Itten had left in 1923, she lost her influence and she left the school the following year. She remained in contact with Bauhaus staff and students, including Kandinsky, who was synesthetic and had a particular interest in her ideas.

From 1924 she taught in Berlin and from 1926 to 1934 in Hamburg. She was a participant, along with former Bauhaus student Ludwig Hirschfeld Mack, in den II. Kongreß für Farbe-Ton-Forschung (Hamburg 1. - 5. Oktober 1930) (English: Second Congress for Colour-Sound Research, Hamburg).

Grunow collaborated in research with the psychologist Heinz Werner, and was an associate of the philosopher Ernst Cassirer, the art historian Gertrud Bing and Hilla von Rebay, who was an abstract artist and the first director of the Solomon R. Guggenheim Museum in New York.

She moved to London with the Warburg Institute, but had to return to Germany at the start World War II. She lived in Düsseldorf from 1939 to 1944. She died in Leverkusen in 1944. She is buried in Bonn.

== See also ==
- Women of the Bauhaus

== Bibliography ==
- Gertrud Grunow (1923) The Creation of Living Form through Color, Form, and Sound in Hans M. Wingler (1969) The Bauhaus: Weimar, Dessau, Berlin Chicago. Cambridge, Massachusetts: MIT Press, pp. 69–73 ISBN 0-262-23033-X
