= Gunta Stölzl =

German textile artist (1897–1983)

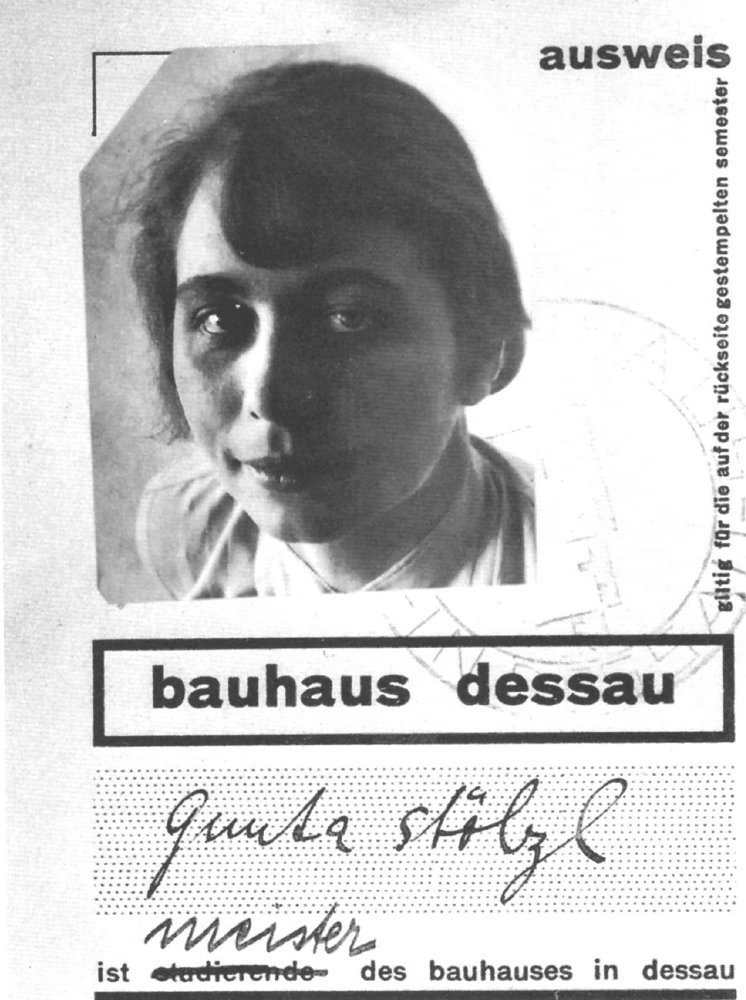
- Born: 5 March 1897; Munich, German Empire
- Died: 22 April 1983 (aged 86); Zurich, Switzerland
- Known for: Weaving
- Spouses: Arieh Sharon (m. 1929; div. 1936); Willy Stadler
- Children: Yael Aloni; Monika Stadler

Gunta Stölzl (5 March 1897 – 22 April 1983) was a German textile artist who played a fundamental role in the development of the Bauhaus school's weaving workshop, where she created enormous change as it transitioned from individual pictorial works to modern industrial designs. She was one of a small number of female teachers on the Bauhaus' staff and the first to hold the title of "Master".

Her textile work is thought to typify the distinctive style of Bauhaus textiles. She joined the Bauhaus as a student in 1919, became a junior master in 1927. She was dismissed for political reasons in 1931, two years before the Bauhaus closed under pressure from the Nazis.

The textile department was a neglected part of the Bauhaus when Stölzl began her career, and its active masters were weak on the technical aspects of textile production. She soon became a mentor to other students and reopened the Bauhaus dye studios in 1921. After a brief departure, Stölzl became the school's weaving director in 1925 when it relocated from Weimar to Dessau and expanded the department to increase its weaving and dyeing facilities. She applied ideas from modern art to weaving, experimented with synthetic materials, and improved the department's technical instruction to include courses in mathematics. The Bauhaus weaving workshop became one of its most successful facilities under her direction.

== Early life ==
Stölzl was born in Munich, Bavaria to Franz Seraph Stölzl, a teacher and school principal and Kreszenz Stürzer, whose father was friends with the reform pedagogue Georg Kerschensteiner. She had one brother, Erwin. She attended a high school for the daughters of professionals, graduating in 1913. She began her studies at the Kunstgewerbeschule (School of Applied Arts) in 1914, where she studied glass painting, decorative arts and ceramics under the well known director Richard Riemerschmid. In 1917 Stölzl's studies were interrupted by the ongoing war and she volunteered to work as a nurse for the Red Cross, behind the front lines until the end of World War I in 1918. Upon her return home she re-immersed herself in her studies at the Kunstgewerbeschule in Munich, where she participated in the school's curriculum reform. It was during this time that Stölzl encountered the Bauhaus manifesto. Having decided to continue her studies at the newly formed Bauhaus school, Stölzl spent the summer of 1919 in the glass workshop and mural painting classes of the Bauhaus to earn her trial acceptance into Johannes Itten’s preliminary course. By 1920, Stölzl had not only been fully accepted into the Bauhaus school, but had received a scholarship to attend.

== Student life ==
African Chair, collaboration with Marcel Breuer 1921

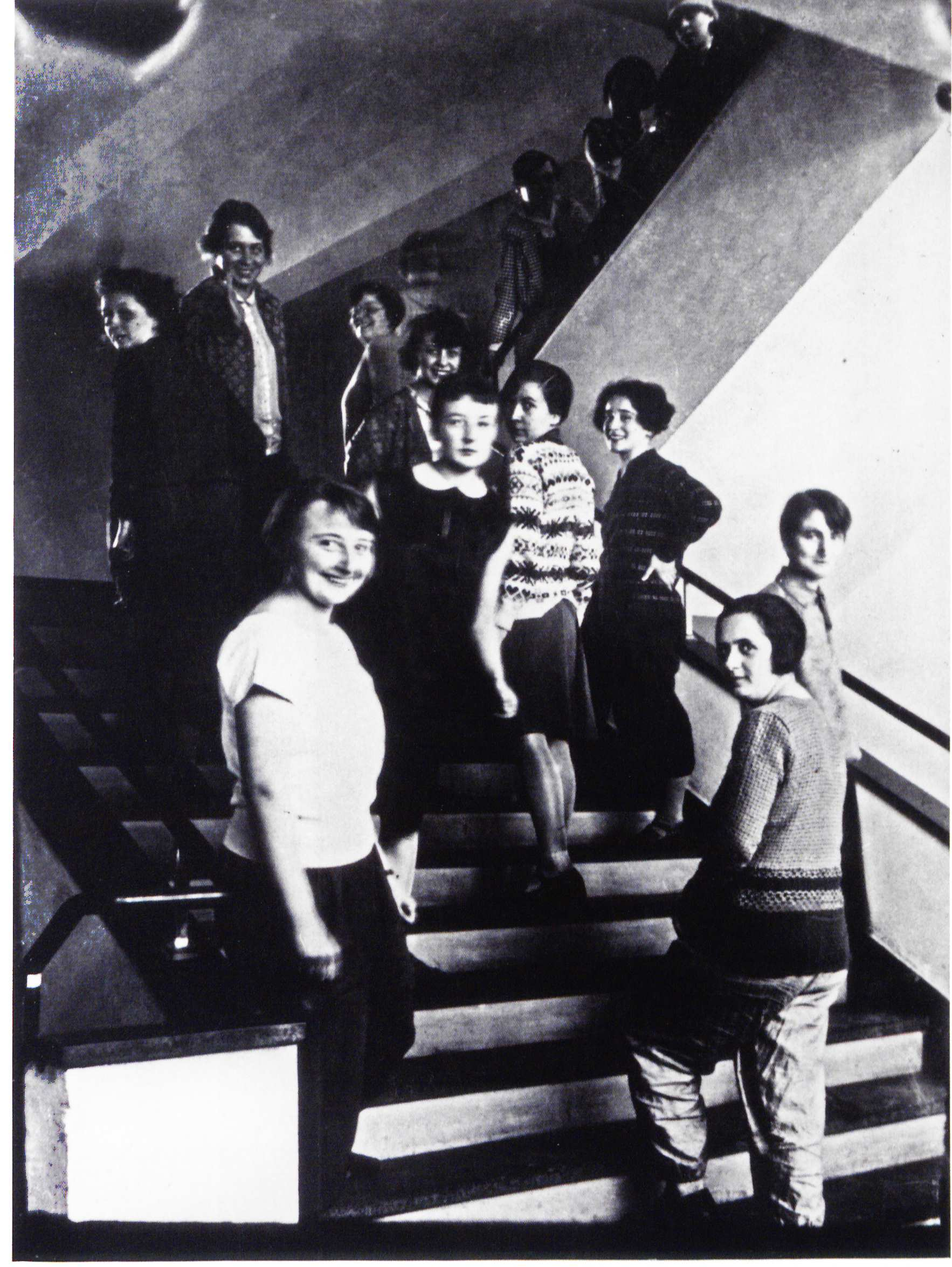
Oskar Schlemmer's weaving class on the steps of the Bauhaus in 1927

Within Stölzl’s first year at the Bauhaus, she began what she referred to as the “women’s department”, which due to the underlying gender roles within the school, eventually became synonymous with the weaving workshop. Stölzl was very active within the weaving department and was immediately seen as a leader among the pack. At the time, the department was putting emphasis on artistic expression and individual works that reflected the teachings and philosophies of the painters who served as Bauhaus masters. The Weimar Bauhaus had a very relaxed atmosphere that was almost wholly dependent on the students teaching themselves and one another. Unfortunately, Georg Muche, who was the head of the weaving workshop at the time, had very little interest in the craft itself. He saw weaving and other textile arts as ‘women’s work’ and thus was of very little help with the technical processes involved. This meant the students were left to their own devices to figure out all technical aspects of a craft most had little experience working in. Due to this set-up, it is important to look at the Weimar era works visually as opposed to technically.

In 1921 Stölzl and two of her friends made a trip to Italy to view the art and architecture they had studied for further inspiration. After passing her journeyman's examination as a weaver and taking courses in textile dyeing at a school in Krefeld, Stölzl was able to reopen the previously abandoned dye studios. It was becoming obvious that she was giving direction to the other students, though unofficially, as neither Muche, the form master nor Helene Börner, the crafts master, could really teach and promote the students in technical aspects. In 1921, Stölzl collaborated with Marcel Breuer on the African Chair – made of painted wood with a colorful textile weave. The first official Bauhaus exhibition took place in September 1923 in the Haus am Horn building. The building itself, primarily designed by Georg Muche, was a simplistic, highly modern cube structure made largely of steel and concrete. Each room of the house was designed around its specific function and had specially made furniture, hardware etc., which had been produced in the Bauhaus workshops. The weaving workshop participated by creating rugs, wall hangings and other objects for various rooms all of which won favorable reviews. With this exhibition, Walter Gropius released an essay titled ‘Art and Technology – A New Unity' which seemed to have a great impact on the women of the weaving workshop. Despite the favorable reviews of their works, the women began to move away from the pictorial imagery and traditional methods they had been working with up to this point and began working abstractly, attempting to make objects more in line with Kandinsky’s teachings of the ‘inner self’.

== Bauhaus master ==
Wall hanging "Slit Tapestry Red/Green" 1927/28

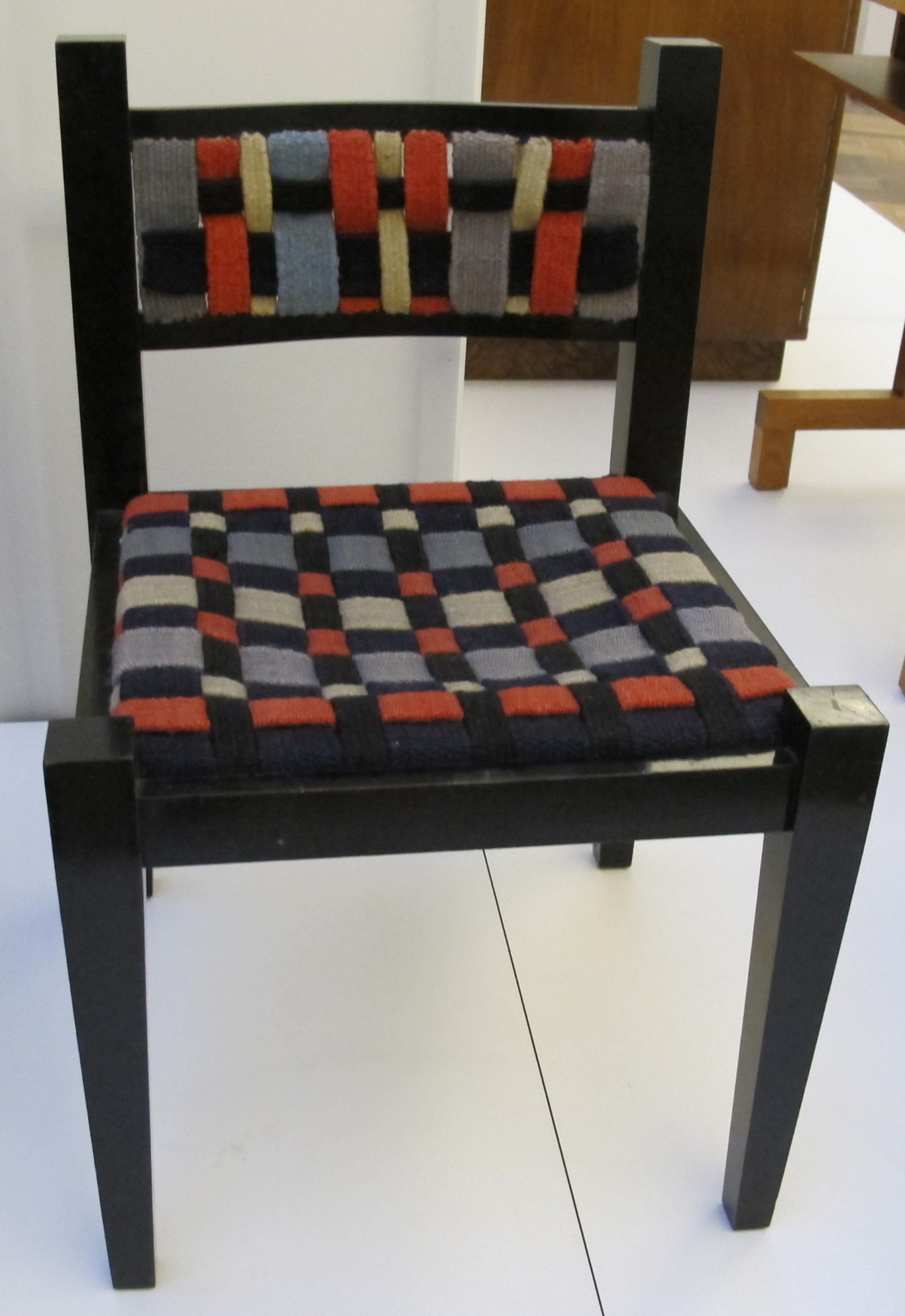
Gunta Stölzl textiles on a Marcel Breuer chair (1922)

In April 1925, the Weimar Bauhaus closed and reopened in Dessau in 1926. Stölzl, who had previously left the Bauhaus upon graduating to help Itten set up Ontos Weaving Workshops in Herrliberg, near Zurich, Switzerland, returned to become the weaving studio's technical director, replacing Helene Börner, and work with Georg Muche, who would remain the form master. Although she was not officially made a junior master until 1927, it was clear both the organization and content of the workshop were under her control. After being appointed "Jungmeister" (Young Master), she became responsible for the entire Weaving Workshop which also then became the most financially successful Bauhaus workshop. It was obvious from the start, the pairing of Muche and Stölzl was not enjoyed by either side, and resulted in Stölzl running the workshop almost single-handedly from 1926 onward.

The new Dessau campus was equipped with a greater variety of looms and much improved dyeing facilities, which allowed Stölzl to create a more structured environment. Georg Muche brought in Jacquard looms to help intensify production. He saw this as especially important now as the workshops were the school's main source of funding for the new Dessau Bauhaus. The students rejected this and were not happy with the way Muche had used the school's funds. This, among other smaller events, instigated a student uprising within the weaving department. On March 31, 1927, despite some staff objections, Muche left the Bauhaus. With his departure, Stölzl took over both as form master and master crafts person of the weaving studio. She was assisted by many other key Bauhaus women, including Anni Albers, Otti Berger and Benita Otte.

Stölzl began trying to move weaving away from its ‘woman’s work’ connotations by applying the vocabulary used in modern art, moving weaving more and more in the direction of industrial design. By 1928, the need for practical materials was highly stressed and experimentation with materials such as cellophane became more prominent. Stölzl quickly developed a curriculum which emphasized the use of handlooms, training in the mechanics of weaving and dyeing, and taught classes in math and geometry, as well as more technical topics such as weave techniques and workshop instruction. The earlier Bauhaus methods of artistic expression were quickly replaced by a design approach which emphasized simplicity and functionality.

Stölzl considered the workshop a place for experimentation and encouraged improvisation. She and her students, especially Anni Albers, were very interested in the properties of a fabric and in synthetic fibers. They tested materials for qualities such as color, texture, structure, resistance to wear, flexibility, light refraction and sound absorption. Stölzl believed the challenge of weaving was to create an aesthetic that was appropriate to the properties of the material. In 1930, Stölzl issued the first ever Bauhaus weaving workshop diplomas and set up the first joint project between the Bauhaus and the Berlin Polytex Textile company which wove and sold Bauhaus designs. ^{1}In 1931 she published an article entitled “The Development of the Bauhaus Weaving Workshop”, in the Bauhaus Journal spring issue. Stölzl's ability to translate complex formal compositions into hand woven pieces combined with her skill of designing for machine production made her by far the best instructor the weaving workshop was to have. Under Stölzl's direction, the weaving workshop became one of the most successful faculties of the Bauhaus.

== Forced resignation ==
The school was constantly under attack as the Nazi Party gained more power, and the school's sacrifices to remain open were beginning to break its own ideology. During Mies van der Rohe’s directorship there was intense pressure from the community for Stölzl to be let go. Van der Rohe required her resignation in 1931, because of the surrounding Nazi atmosphere in Dessau, while Swastikas were painted on Stölzl's door. The students were so opposed to this action that they dedicated an entire issue of the school newspaper to Stölzl. The Dessau campus of the Bauhaus was closed in 1932 by the Nazis, and the Bauhaus itself, which had moved from Dessau to Berlin, officially dissolved, by vote of the faculty, on 19 July 1933.

== After the Bauhaus ==
After leaving the Bauhaus in 1931, Stölzl returned to Zurich where she and her partners Gertrud Preiswerk and Heinrich-Otto Hürlimann, also former Bauhaus students, created a private handweaving business called S-P-H Stoffe (S-P-H Fabrics). The business floundered and closed soon after, in 1933, due to financial difficulties. Stölzl became a member of the Schweizerischer Werkbund in 1932 and in 1934 "Das Werk", the Werkbund's official magazine, profiled her career. It was also in 1934 that Stölzl received a major commission to make curtains for the Zurich cinema. In 1935, Stölzl and her former partner Heinrich-Otto Hürlimann took another crack at business together and opened S&H Stoffe. By 1937, Stölzl became the sole owner of Handweberei Flora (Hand Weaving Studio Flora) and had joined the Gesellschaft Schweizer Malerinnen, Bildhauerinnen und Kunstgewerblerinnen (Society of Swiss Women Painters, Sculptors and Craftswomen). During the following decades, both the Museum of Modern Art in New York and the Busch-Reisinger Museum in Cambridge, Massachusetts acquired pieces of Stölzl's work while she continued to work at her hand weaving business, creating mainly textiles for interior design. In 1967 Stölzl dissolved her business and devoted all her time to tapestry weaving, a large shift in focus. It was also in 1967 that the Victoria and Albert Museum acquired her designs and samples, resulting in major national and international collections.

== Personal life and death ==
in 1929, Stölzl married the Israeli architecture student Arieh Sharon and lost German citizenship. Their daughter Yael was born in 1929. In 1936 Stölzl and Sharon divorced. In 1942, age 45 she married Willy Stadler and became a Swiss citizen. In 1943 she gave birth to daughter Monika in Zurich. Stölzl died April 22, 1983, in Zurich at the age of 86.

== Legacy ==
Stözl's legacy is upheld by her two daughters Monika Stadler and Yael Aloni, who have compiled a primary source collection of her writings and designs. They have used this collection to create an illustrated biography of the artist, which was produced in collaboration with the Museum of Modern Art. There is a street named after Stölzl in Munich, Germany.

Stözl's work was included in the 2021 exhibition Women in Abstraction at the Centre Pompidou.

== See also ==
- Fiber art
- Margaretha Reichardt
- Friedl Dicker-Brandeis
- Margaret Leischner
- Paul Klee
- Wassily Kandinsky
- Women of the Bauhaus
