= Johannes Itten =

Swiss painter, designer, and art educator

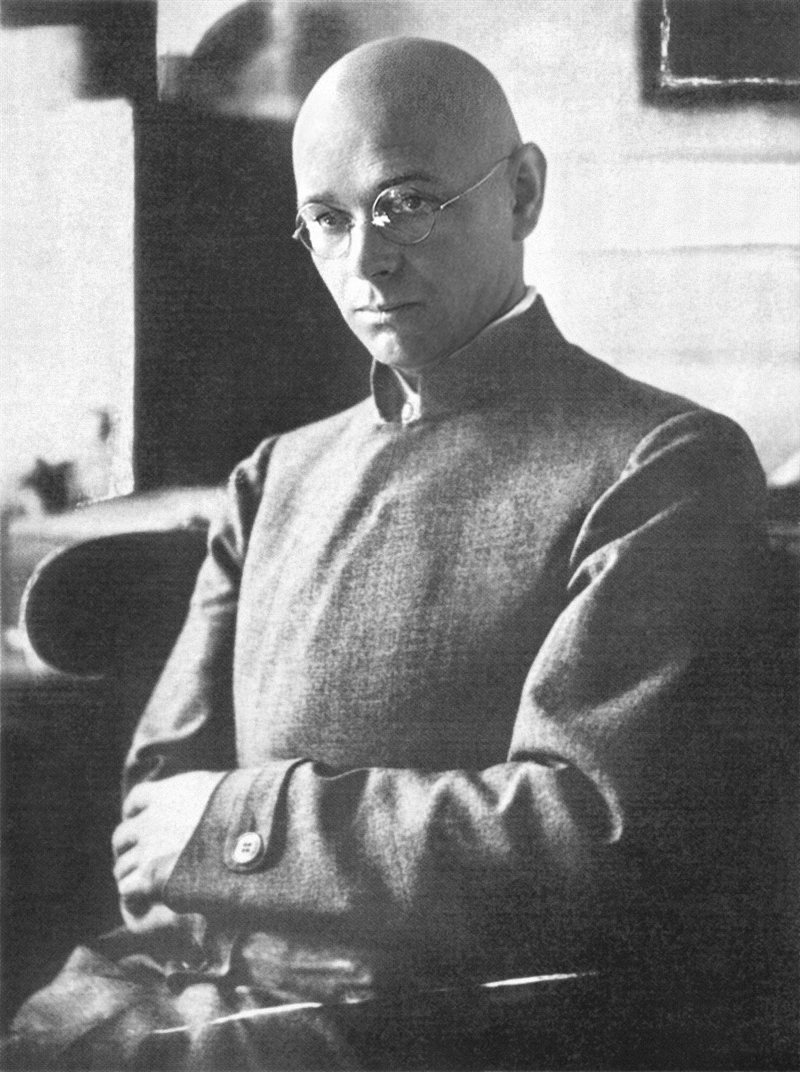
- Itten c. 1920
- Born: 11 November 1888; Südern-Linden, Switzerland
- Died: 25 March 1967 (aged 78); Zürich, Switzerland
- Education: Academy of Arts, Stuttgart
- Known for: Painting, Drawing, Color theory, Architecture
- Notable work: Farbkreis (1961)
- Movement: Expressionism

Johannes Itten (11 November 1888 – 25 March 1967) was a Swiss expressionist painter, designer, teacher, writer and theorist associated with the Bauhaus (Staatliches Bauhaus) school. Together with German-American painter Lyonel Feininger and German sculptor Gerhard Marcks, under the direction of German architect Walter Gropius, Itten was part of the core of the Weimar Bauhaus.

== Life and work ==
He was born in Südern-Linden, Switzerland. From 1904 to 1908 he trained as an elementary school teacher. Beginning in 1908 he taught using methods developed by the creator of the kindergarten concept, Friedrich Fröbel, and was exposed to the ideas of psychoanalysis. In 1909 he enrolled at the École des Beaux-Arts in Geneva but was unimpressed with the educators there, and returned to Bern. Itten's studies at the Bern-Hofwil Teachers' Academy with Ernst Schneider proved seminal for his later work as a master at the Bauhaus. Itten adopted principles espoused by Schneider, including the practice of not correcting his students' creative work on an individual basis, for fear that this would crush the creative impulse. Rather, he selected certain common mistakes to correct for the class as a whole. In 1912, he returned to Geneva, where he studied under Eugène Gilliard, an abstract painter.

He was heavily influenced by Adolf Hölzel and Franz Cižek. Itten opened a private art school in Vienna, using the work and textbook of Eugène Gilliard as a base. From Hölzel, Itten adopted a series of basic shapes (the line, the plane, the circle, the spiral) as a means from which to begin creation, and the use of gymnastic exercises to relax his students and prepare them for the experiences that were to occur in the class.

"Farbkreis" by Johannes Itten (1961). Main topic: RYB color model.

From 1919 to 1922, Itten taught at the Bauhaus, developing the innovative "preliminary course" which was to teach students the basics of material characteristics, composition, and color. "Itten theorized seven types of color contrast and devised exercises to teach them. His color contrasts include[d] (1) contrast by hue, (2) contrast by value, (3) contrast by temperature, (4) contrast by complements (neutralization), (5) simultaneous contrast (from Chevreul), (6) contrast by saturation (mixtures with gray), and (7) contrast by extension (from Goethe)."

In 1919 he invited Gertrud Grunow, to teach a course on the "theory of harmony" at the Bauhaus. This involved using music and relaxation techniques with the aim of improving the students' creativity.

In 1920 Itten invited Paul Klee and Georg Muche to join him at the Bauhaus. He published a book, The Art of Color, which describes his ideas as a furthering of Adolf Hölzel's color wheel. Itten's so called "color sphere" went on to include 12 colors.

In 1924, Itten established the Ontos Weaving Workshops near Zürich, with the help of Bauhaus weaver Gunta Stölzl.

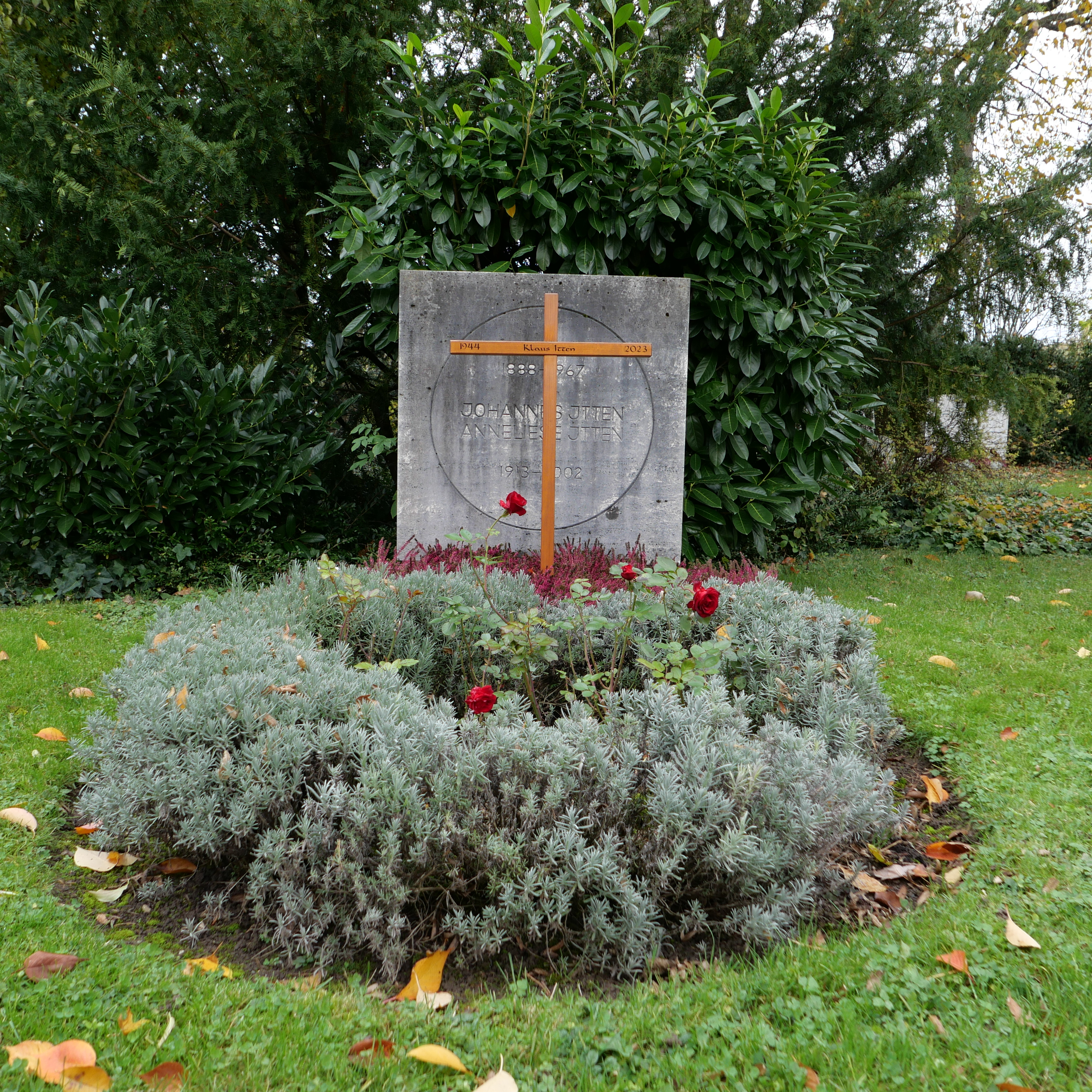
The grave of Itten, his second wife Anneliese, née Schlösser (1913-2002), and of one of their three children, Klaus Itten (1944-2023), who was a professor of geography at the University of Zurich, at the cemetery of Hönggerberg in Zürich.

Itten was a follower of Mazdaznan, a neo-Zoroastrian religion founded in the United States. He observed a strict vegetarian diet and practiced meditation as a means to develop inner understanding and intuition, which was for him the principal source of artistic inspiration and practice. Itten's mysticism and the reverence in which he was held by a group of the students, some of whom converted to Mazdaznan (e.g. Georg Muche), created conflict with Walter Gropius who wanted to move the school in a direction that embraced mass production rather than solely individual artistic expression. The rift led to Itten's resignation from the Bauhaus and his prompt replacement by László Moholy-Nagy in 1923. From 1926 to 1934 he had a small art and architecture school in Berlin, in which Ernst Neufert, the former chief-architect of Walter Gropius at the Bauhaus, taught as well from 1932 to 1934.

Itten's works exploring the use and composition of color resemble the square op art canvases of artists such as Josef Albers, Max Bill and Bridget Riley, and the expressionist works of Wassily Kandinsky.

- 1926–1934 Private art school in Berlin
- 1932–1938 Director of the Textilfachschule in Krefeld
- 1938–1954 Director at the Kunstgewerbeschule Zürich
- 1943–1960 Director of the Textilfachschule in Zürich
- 1949–1956 Director of the Museum Rietberg, Zürich, a museum for non-European art
- 1955 works as freelance painter
- 1955 colour courses at the HfG Ulm (Hochschule für Gestaltung Ulm)

== Influence ==
Itten's work on color is also said to be an inspiration for seasonal color analysis. Itten had been the first to associate color palettes with four types of people, and had designated those types with the names of seasons. His studies of color palettes and color interaction directly influenced the Op Art movement and other color abstraction base movements. Shortly after his death, his designations gained popularity in the cosmetics industry with the publication of Color Me A Season. Cosmetologists today continue to use seasonal color analysis, a tribute to the early work by Itten.

== Bibliography ==
- Itten, Johannes (1975). Design and form: the basic course at the Bauhaus. New York: Van Nostrand Reinhold. ISBN 0-500-28534-9.
- Itten, Johannes (1973). The Art of Color: the subjective experience and objective rationale of color. New York: Van Nostrand Reinhold. ISBN 0-442-24037-6.
- Itten, Johannes, and Birren, Faber (1970). The Elements of Color: A Treatise on the Color System of Johannes Itten Based on His Book The Art of Color. New York: Van Nostrand Reinhold. ISBN 0-442-24038-4

== Filmography ==
- „Johannes Itten – Bauhaus-Pionier", Documentary, Directed by: Marina Rumjanzewa, 2018
