= Heinrich Brocksieper =

German painter

- Born: 15 April 1898; Hagen, German Empire
- Died: 24 April 1968 (aged 70); Hagen, West Germany
- Education: Malerfachschule, Hagen (1915-1916); Bauhaus (1919-1922)
- Occupations: Painter, photographer, animator
- Spouse: Annemarie Bauer (married 1938 - 1968)
- Children: de:Utz Brocksieper (1939-) (Sculptor); Klaus Brocksieper (1940-1995)
- Relatives: Falko Brocksieper (1976-),(Grandson), (DJ and musician)
- Website: Brocksieper-art.de

Heinrich Brocksieper (15 April 1898 – 24 April 1968) was a German photographer, experimental filmmaker and painter who was educated at the Bauhaus design school.

== Life and work ==
Heinrich Bocksieper was born on 15 April 1898 in Hagen, Germany. His grandfather was a metalsmith who ran a smithery, his father was a self-employed master-painter. Primary schooling in Hagen was followed by one year of business school. After that Brocksieper attended a professional school for painting in Hagen from 1915 to 1916 where he joined classes in drawing, painting and design.

=== Career ===
From 1916 to 1918 during World War I he served his compulsory military service in Russia and France, fell sick with a lung infection in the trenches of the Western front and was hospitalized. After the end of the war he returned to Hagen to continue his studies at the Malerfachschule until 1919.

In 1919 he was inspired by the "Hagener Impuls" of Karl Ernst Osthaus, who showed the first big exhibition of Lyonel Feininger in Hagen's Museum Folkwang, and supported by his teacher Max Austermann, Brocksieper took up studies at the newly founded Bauhaus in Weimar, starting the winter semester of 1919.

From 1919 to 1922 he studied at the Bauhaus in Weimar. He attended the newly established preliminary course of Johannes Itten, along with his fellow artists from Hagen, Reinhard Hilker and Erna Mayweg. He participated in exhibitions for the first time in 1920; the development of the illness he caught in the war forced him to interrupt his studies and leave for recuperation in Merano (South Tyrol). Back at the Bauhaus, he continued his studies until 1922, working in the graphic printing workshop of Lyonel Feininger, who has a formative influence on Brocksieper's artistic development. He spent the years 1923 and 1924 traveling with a friend, Hugo Isenberg, in southern Germany, Austria and Italy. There they earned their living with the restoration of works. In 1924 Brocksieper left for another recuperation stay in Merano. In Hagen, Hannes Behler, Albert Buske, August Agatz and Will Lammert were among his fellow artists. He encouraged his friend August Agatz to enrol at the Bauhaus in Dessau. Albert Buske, Max Gebhard and Waldemar Alder follow him to undertake their studies there.

Until 1927 he was a member of the artist group "Hagenring" and participated in their exhibitions. From 1927 on photography and film dominated his artistic work. He established a photo and film studio and created "perpelleristische Filme" (propellering rotating animations) and cartoons on 35mm film, which he processes himself. With numerous trips to Weimar, Dessau and Berlin he kept close contact with the Bauhaus until 1933. After his father's death, he earned his livelihood in his mother's small paint and glass shop while he continued his art.

In the early 1930s in addition to his film studio Brocksieper also operated a second small studio in Hagen-Wehringhausen where the young painter Emil Schumacher (1912–1999), who was living in the neighborhood, was one of his frequent guests, with which he shared frequent artistic exchanges until the mid-1950s.

In 1933 he denied studio visits and exhibition participations to the Nazis. In 1938 he married Annemarie Brocksieper, their first son Utz was born in 1939, followed by their son Klaus († 1995) born in 1940.

In World War II he saw compulsory military service on the Eastern and Western fronts. In 1944 Brocksieper's house and studio were destroyed in bombing raids and his paintings, drawings, photos and films were destroyed with only fragments remaining.

=== Post War ===
After the war he resumed his artistic work making linear and charcoal drawings. He discovered the "perspective of close objects" utilizing "tactile viewing", and henceforth based all his paintings on those concepts. He resumed contact to his friends from the Bauhaus, wrote to Maria Rasch and to Gustavo Keller-Ruiz in Chile. In 1950 an exchange of letter ensued between him and Lyonel Feininger in New York.

In 1954 Brocksieper made his first post-war trip to Weimar where he met old friends from the Bauhaus, including Harry Scheibe and Martin Pohle. In Weimar he got to know graphic artist and lyricist Arno Fehringer (1907–1974) with whom he exchanged many letters until his death.

His late work developed as follows: every day objects with signs of usage, portraits and self-portraits focused on imaging the substance were the central theme of his pastel drawings which he created following his formula "FORM, FARBE + MATERIE" (shape, colour + substance).

Until his death he earned his living in his small paint and glass shop. He died in Hagen on 24 April 1968.

A summary of all periods of his work - drawings done at the Bauhaus in 1919, early photographs, fragments of film works, linear charcoal and pastel drawings, as well as the exchange of letters with Feininger are today owned by the Klassik Stiftung Weimar, Bauhaus Museum.

== Exhibitions ==
- 1920: Niederrheinausstellung - Kunstkabinett-Kollock, Hagen
- until 1927: Ausstellungen mit der Künstlervereinigung "Hagenring"
- 1927 onwards: Heinrich Brocksieper does not exhibit any of his works until his death

=== Selected posthumous exhibitions ===
- 1970: Atelier im Hof, Hagen (solo exhibition)
- 1971: Tatkreis Kunst der Ruhr, Forum Kunst, Essen (solo exhibition)
- 1972: Städt. Galerie Torhaus, Dortmund (solo exhibition)
- 1975: "Aspekte zur Kunst der Nachkriegszeit", Forum Kunst, Essen
- 1978: Karl Ernst Osthaus-Museum Hagen (solo exhibition)
- 1980: "bauhaus-2. generation", Galerie Symbol, Cologne
- 1984: "Der westdeutsche Impuls 1900 - 1914", Karl Ernst Osthaus-Museum, Hagen
- 1992: "Vom Folkwang-Museum zum Karl Ernst Osthaus Museum", Karl Ernst Osthaus-Museum, Hagen
- seit 1995: Klassik Stiftung Weimar / Bauhaus-Museum
- 1995: "basis bauhaus... westfalen", Westfälisches Museumsamt, Münster
- 1997: "Bauhaus Weimar - europäische Avantgarde 1919-1925", Czech Museum for Fine Arts, Prague
- 1998: "Heinrich Brocksieper-Nahsichten", Klassik Stiftung Weimar / Bauhaus-Museum (solo exhibition)
- 1998: "Heinrich Brocksieper-Nahsichten", Märkisches Museum (Witten), (solo exhibition)
- 1999: "Lichtbilder auf Papier-Fotografie in Westfalen 1860-1960", Westfälisches Museumsamt, Münster
- 1999: "75 Jahre Hagenring", Karl Ernst Osthaus Museum, Hagen
- 2001: "Collagewelten - Zur Collage im 20. Jahrhundert", Kunst-Museum, Ahlen
- 2002: "HÄNDE begreifen", Phyletisches Museum, Jena
- 2005: "Max Austermann und Schüler", Hagenring-Galerie, Hagen
- 2006: "heinrich brocksieper. bauhaus-fotografie-filmexperimente", Freundeskreis der Bauhausuniversität Weimar e.V., Haus am Horn, Weimar (solo exhibition)
- 2009: "Bauhaus in Aktion“, Filmausstellung, Stiftung Bauhaus Dessau, Dessau
- 2015: Bauhaus and Abstract Films, 7 to 28 February 2015, National Museum of Modern and Contemporary Art, South Korea.

== Literature ==
- Karl Ernst Osthaus Museum Hagen (ed.), Johann Heinrich Müller, Heinrich Brocksieper, Hagen 1978
- Wolfgang Wangler (ed.), Bauhaus - 2. Generation, Köln 1980, ISBN 3-9800350-0-X
- Westfälisches Museumsamt Münster (ed.), Basis Bauhaus... Westfalen, Münster 1995, ISBN 3-927204-31-5
- Heimatbuch Hagen+Mark (ed.), Horst Kniese, Perspektive der Nahen Dinge, Hagen 1998
- Kunstsammlungen zu Weimar (ed.), Michael Siebenbrodt, Heinrich Brocksieper - Nahsichten, Weimar 1998, ISBN 3-929323-15-X
- Volker Jacob (ed.), Ullrich Hermanns, Lichtbilder auf Papier - Fotografie in Westfalen 1860 - 1960, Münster 1999, ISBN 3-87023-143-2
- Michael Siebenbrodt (ed.), Bbauhaus - Weimar - Entwürfe für die Zukunft, Ostfildern-Ruit/Stuttgart 2000, ISBN 3-7757-9030-6
- Burkhard Leismann (ed.), CollageWelten 1. Das Experiment - Zur Collage im 20. Jahrhundert, Bramsche 2001, ISBN 3-935326-52-1
- Christian Tesch/Ulrich Völkel (ed.), Kleines lexikon Bauhaus Weimar, Weimar 2010, ISBN 978-3-939964-14-8
- Thomas Tode (ed.), Bauhaus and Film, Wien-Köln-Weimar 2012, ISBN 978-3-205-78708-2

== See also ==
- List of German painters
