= Haus am Horn =

Bauhaus house in Weimar, Germany

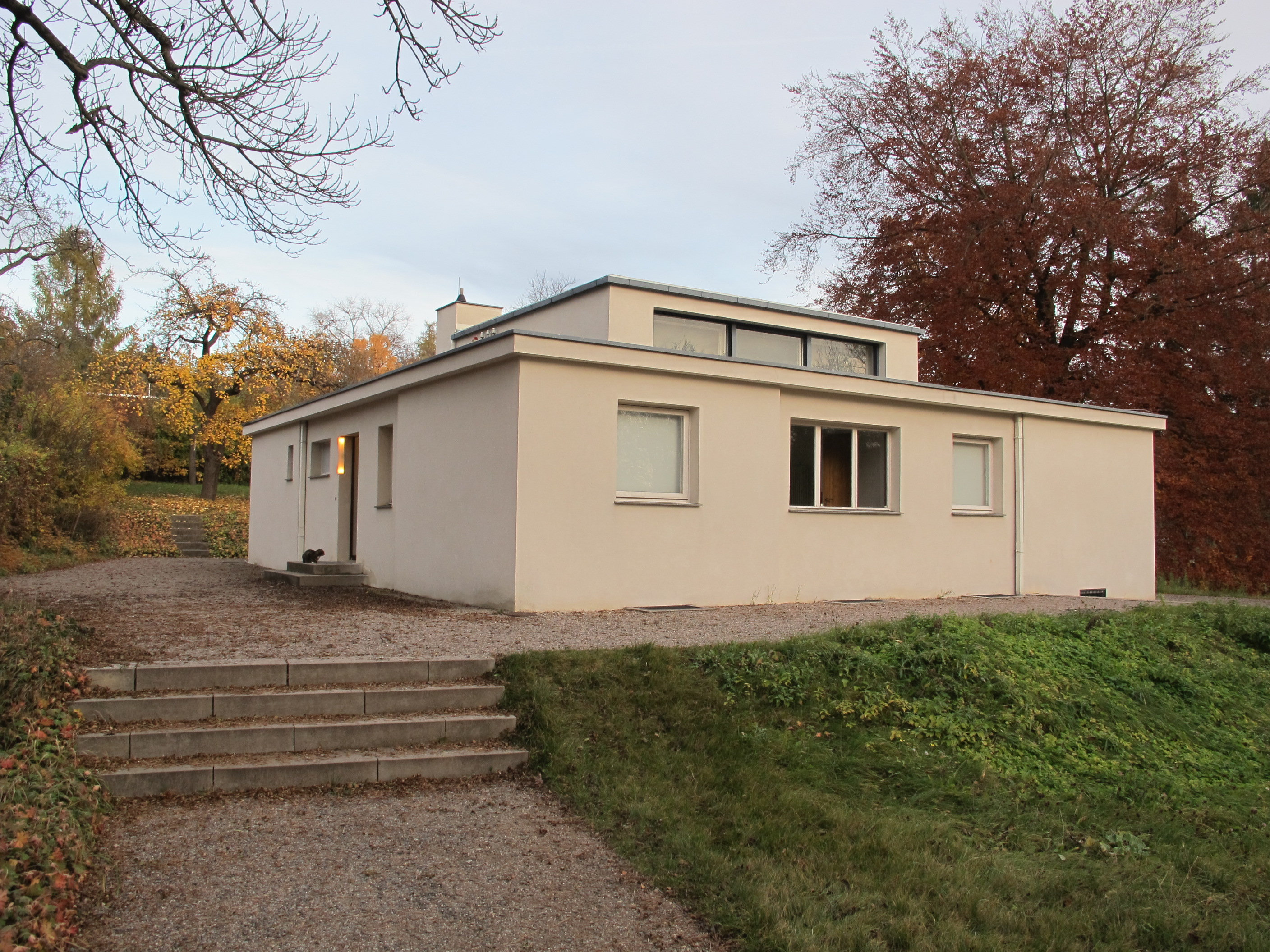
- Haus am Horn, Weimar

General information
- Type: single-family dwelling
- Architectural style: International modern
- Location: 61 am Horn, Weimar, Germany
- Coordinates: 50°58′26″N 11°20′22″E
- Opened: 1923
- Renovated: 1971-73, 1998-99, 2018-19
- Owner: Klassik Stiftung Weimar

Design and construction
- Architects: Georg Muche, Adolf Meyer

UNESCO World Heritage Site
- Type: Cultural
- Criteria: ii, iv, vi
- Designated: 1996 (20th session), modified 2017
- Reference no.: 729bis-003
- Region: Europe and North America

The Haus am Horn is a domestic house in Weimar, Germany, designed by Georg Muche. It was built for the Bauhaus Werkschau (English: Work show) exhibition which ran from July to September 1923. It was the first building based on Bauhaus design principles, which revolutionized 20th century architectural and aesthetic thinking and practice.

In keeping with the Bauhaus philosophy of teaching via practical experience and working with industry, a number of students were involved with the building project.

In 1996 the building was inscribed as part of the UNESCO World Heritage Site now called the Bauhaus and its Sites in Weimar, Dessau and Bernau, because of its testimony to the architectural influence of the Bauhaus movement.

== Description ==
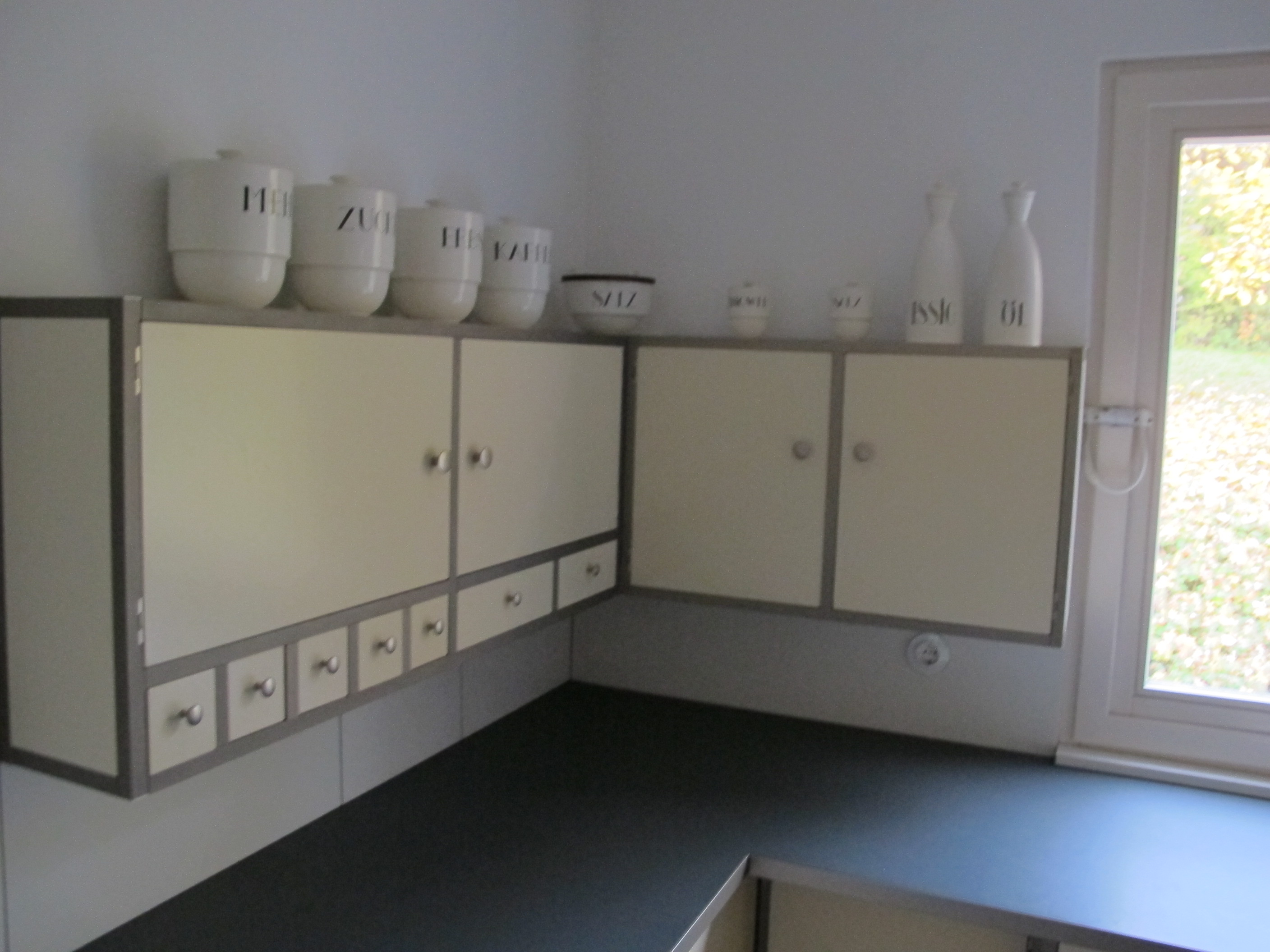
Haus am Horn kitchen, in 2011

It is a simple cubic design with a flat roof, utilizing steel and concrete in its construction. Saving energy was an important consideration as the deprivations of World War I fuel shortages were still fresh in mind. The main clerestory-lit living area is at the core, with the other rooms around it. Only the work niche of the living room has a wall that directly faces the outside. There is a basement level for utility use such as washing and drying clothes. The walls have three layers: an external concrete wall; an inner insulating layer made of a peat-based material called 'Torfoleum'; and the interior wall lining. The windows were larger on the south and west sides; the northern side was almost without windows.

The house had four bedrooms, described as the lady's room, the gentleman's room, the children's room and the guest room. It also had a kitchen, pantry and a separate dining room, a living room with a work space off it, and a separate toilet and bathroom. It had coal-fired central heating and a gas-fueled Junkers boiler in the bathroom, and a gas kitchen stove. Heating and ventilation shafts were fitted in the corners of the living room.

The house was built away from the main Bauhaus campus, at 61 am Horn, a street of upper-middle class Gründerzeit villas. The plot was previously used as a vegetable garden to supply fruit and vegetables for the Bauhaus canteen. All the furniture and fittings were made in the Bauhaus workshops. László Moholy-Nagy designed the lights, which were made in the Bauhaus metal workshop. Marcel Breuer, who was a student at the time, designed furniture, including the built-in cabinetry. Marta Erps-Breuer designed a rug for a room that held some of Breuer's furniture. Alma Siedhoff-Buscher designed the furniture and toys for the children's room.

The kitchen was designed by Benita Koch-Otte and built by Erich Brendel (1898–1987). It was a source of inspiration for the Frankfurt kitchen, designed by Margarete Schütte-Lihotzky in 1926. Theodor Bogler designed the kitchen ceramics, which were labeled to show what each item should contain. Koch-Otte also designed and wove the carpet for the children's room.

Alfred Arndt and Josef Maltan (1902–1975) planned the interior colour scheme, which was rediscovered during restoration work carried out in 1998–99. They used a calming green-yellow for the living room and brighter colours for the rooms on the colder side of the house.

== History ==
The Haus am Horn was built for the first exhibition of work by the Bauhaus design school in 1923, which had been founded in Weimar in 1919. The building was based on designs by Georg Muche, a painter and a teacher at the school. It was thought at the time that it would be a model for houses on an envisioned Bauhaus campus, which was to have a housing estate for the school's teachers, but this never came to fruition. For this reason the house is sometimes called the "Musterhaus" in German ("pattern house"), i.e., a show home.

Gropius had planned to design it himself, but in a democratic ballot students chose a design Muche had originally planned as a house for himself and his wife. At the time the Bauhaus had no architecture department to manage the project, so Gropius' own architecture firm took on the work, completing the building in only four months. The construction was overseen by Adolf Meyer. The project was financed with an interest-free loan from Adolf Sommerfeld, a German-Jewish Berlin real estate developer, for whom Gropius, with contributions from Bauhaus staff and students, had built the Haus Sommerfeld, a villa in Berlin-Lichterfelde, in 1920–21.

=== After the exhibition ===
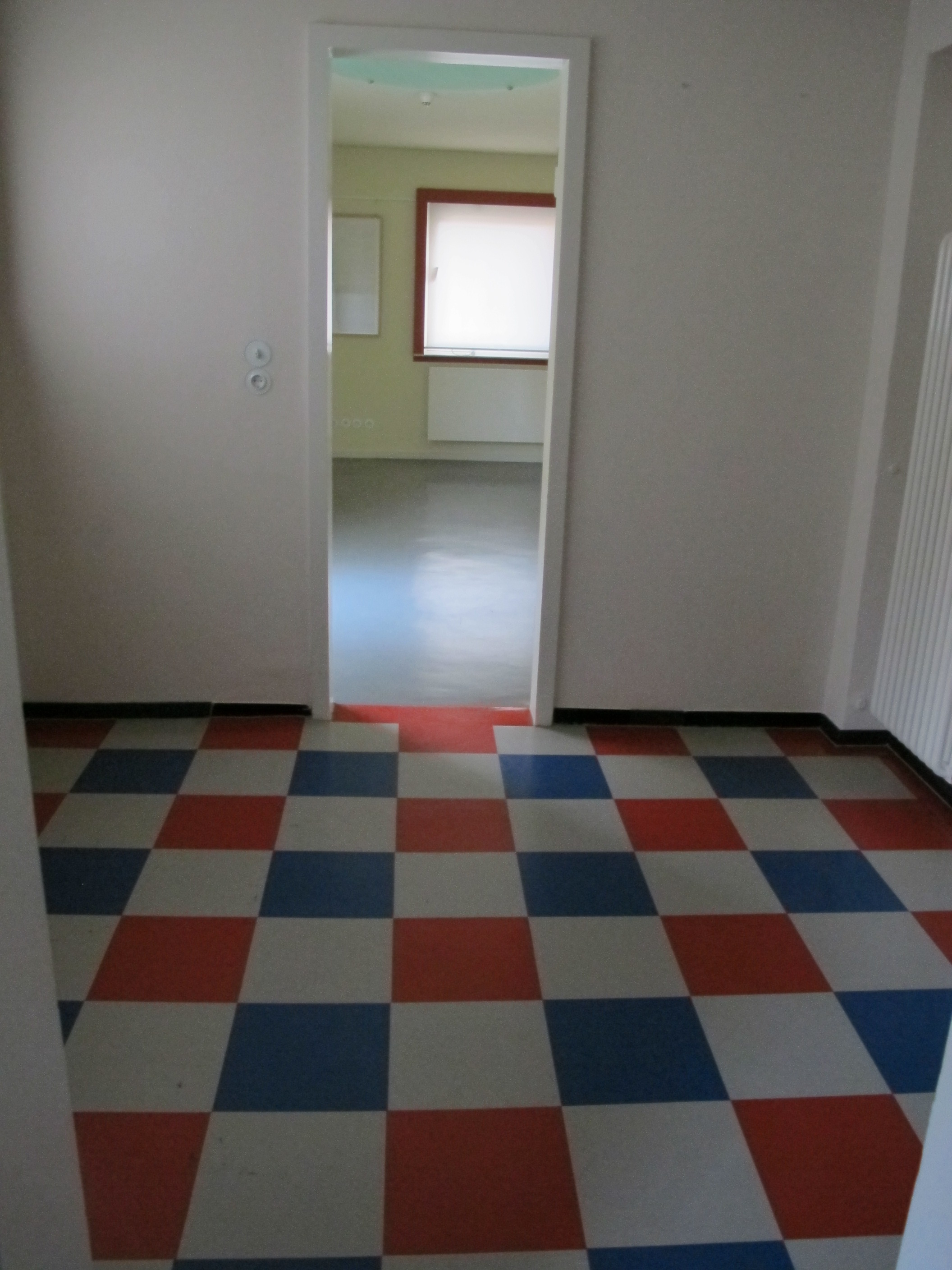
Dining room, looking through into the children's room, November 2011

The Werkschau exhibition lasted three months and after that, as had been agreed, the house and its contents became Sommerfeld's property. In December 1923 he put the house on the market and had the furniture transported to Berlin. Most of these items have gone missing over the years, but the Bauhaus Dessau Foundation has a dressing table from the "lady's room" and a glass cabinet from the living room, both designed by Marcel Breuer. The Bauhaus Museum Weimar has a copy of the toy cupboard designed by Siedhoff-Buscher, which was made at around the same time as the exhibition. Copies of these three pieces of furniture were rebuilt for the 2019 restoration of the house.

The house remained empty until September 1924 when it was sold to a lawyer, Franz Kühn, who engaged the architect Ernst Flemming to make a number of alterations. Between 1926 and 1933, the changes included adding a veranda, extending the living room and children's room, adding a room to the western corner, and creating direct external access to the cellar.

In April 1938 Kühn was compelled to sell the house to the German Labour Front, (German:Deutsche Arbeitsfront (DAF)), who planned to demolish it and build an Adolf Hitler School on the plot, however World War II put a halt to these plans. The DAF let the house to a German army officer and his family for the duration of the war. In September 1945 the occupying Soviet military forces confiscated the house from the DAF and put it under the administration of Weimar City Council, who let the property to residential tenants. In 1951 it became Volkseigentum (public property) in the ownership of the city council. Until 1971, a number of families lived there and further alterations were made.

=== Bernd Grönwald ===
In September 1971 Bernd Grönwald (1942–1991) rented the house and lived there with his wife and three sons. He was a lecturer in architectural theory and history at the Hochschule für Architektur und Bauwesen Weimar, a predecessor of the Bauhaus University Weimar. In 1980, he became the Dean of Architecture and in 1986 he was also appointed vice-president of the Bauakademie der DDR. The academy was a government agency that operated as the central research institution for architecture and construction in East Germany. Grönwald was also a functionary of the SED, the ruling political party.

Grönwald had an interest in modernism and the Bauhaus. He had many contacts with former Bauhaus students and staff, including Georg Muche, both within and outside of East Germany. Because he was a trusted supporter of the regime, he was allowed to travel to the West to conduct research. He restored parts of the house that had been damaged by age and damp and began the process of getting the property historic monument protection status, which it was given in 1973. In September 1973 he set up a small exhibition about the history of the house in the living room. Although it was the family's private home, they allowed the public to visit it. During the 27 years they lived in the house, over 40,000 people came. From 1976, Grönwald organised Bauhaus colloquiums to promote research about the house and the Bauhaus in general.

Grönwald had difficulties accepting life after German reunification and committed suicide in January 1991. His family continued to live in the Haus am Horn until May 1998.

=== 1998-2017 ===
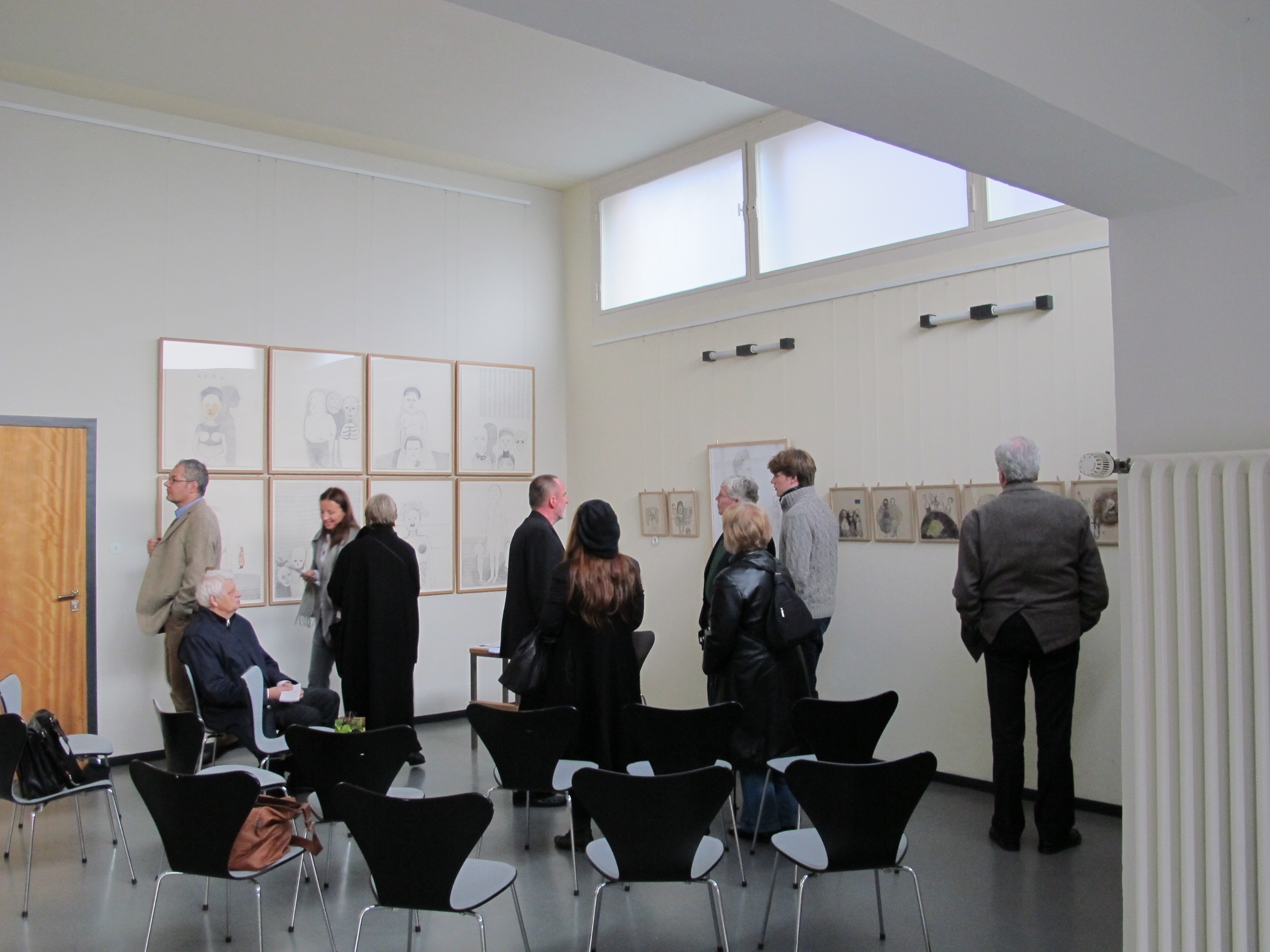
An exhibition in the "living room" of the Haus am Horn, 5 November 2011

From 1998 until 2017 the City of Weimar leased the building to the Freundeskreis der Bauhaus-Universität Weimar ('Friendship circle of the Bauhaus University Weimar') which instigated a restoration in 1998–99, during which the additions from 1926 to 1933 were removed. University staff and students used the building and over 30 exhibitions and 300 events were held in it. It was open to the public several days a week.

== Haus am Horn today ==
Since August 2017 the building has been owned by the Klassik Stiftung Weimar.

In preparation for the 2019 Bauhaus centenary celebrations, the house was closed for a major restoration in 2018–19, which cost €838,000. It reopened on 18 May 2019, the 136th anniversary of Walter Gropius's birthday.

== Reception ==
There was a lot of interest in the house during the Werkschau exhibition and streams of people came to visit it. The local residents gave it the nickname "die Kaffeemühle" (the coffee grinder) because of its square shape and clerestory roof, which resemble a typical early 20th century coffee grinder. The reception by the media ranged between sympathetic admiration and, more often, open rejection.

Although the reviews of the house were mixed, the most popular items were the toys and multi-functional toy cupboard in the children's room designed by Siedhoff-Buscher. This displeased the director of the Bauhaus Walter Gropius, as he thought that the school being well known for designing products for children would lessen its academic standing.

The architects Mies van der Rohe and Le Corbusier expressed admiration for the design, whilst traditionalists like Paul Schultze-Naumburg were critical.

== See also ==
- ADGB Trade Union School
- List of World Heritage Sites in Germany
