= Alma Siedhoff-Buscher =

German designer (1899–1944)

- Born: 4 January 1899; Kreuztal, Germany
- Died: 25 September 1944 (aged 45); Buschlag, Germany
- Education: Reimann School, Berlin; Unterrichtsanstalt des Kunstgewerbemuseums Berlin; Bauhaus
- Occupation: designer
- Years active: 1922–1927
- Known for: Furniture and toy design
- Notable work: Furniture for Haus am Horn
- Spouse: de:Werner Siedhoff (1899–1976) (actor)
- Children: de:Joost Siedhoff (actor); 1 daughter

Alma Siedhoff-Buscher (4 January 1899 – 25 September 1944), born Alma Buscher, was a German designer. She trained at the Reimann School in Berlin, the Unterrichtsanstalt des Kunstgewerbemuseums Berlin and the Bauhaus.

== Life and work ==
Alma Buscher was born on 4 January 1899 in Kreuztal in North Rhine-Westphalia, Germany. From 1917 she studied at the Reimann School in Berlin, and afterwards at the Unterrichtsanstalt des Kunstgewerbemuseums Berlin, a former school of applied arts that was a department of the Berlin Museum of Decorative Arts (Kunstgewerbemuseum Berlin).

In 1922 Buscher began studying at the Bauhaus in Weimar and like all students initially attended the preliminary course run by Johannes Itten and classes by Paul Klee and Wassily Kandinsky. She was subsequently accepted into the Weaving Workshop, but in 1923, with the support of Georg Muche and Josef Hartwig, she switched to the Wood Sculpture Workshop. As part of the first exhibition of Bauhaus work in 1923, she designed furniture for the children's room in the Haus am Horn in Weimar, as well as a puppet theater and children's toys.

The reviews of the Haus am Horn were mixed, but the most popular items were the toys and multi-functional toy cupboard in the children's room designed by Siedhoff-Buscher. This displeased the director of the Bauhaus Walter Gropius, as he thought that the school being well known for designing products for children would lessen its reputation as an academic institution. Gropius wasn't very keen on a woman being in the Wood Sculpture Workshop in any case, as he was of the opinion that women couldn't deal with three-dimensional design and were better working with two-dimensional patterns in the Weaving Workshop. Most of the furniture exhibited in the Haus am Horn no longer exists, but copy of toy cupboard made at the same time as the exhibition is in the collection of the Bauhaus Museum Weimar. A copy of it was made for the 2019 restoration of the house.

In 1924, while Buscher was still a student, the Zeiss Kindergarten in Jena was fitted out with furniture she designed. In the same year her furniture designs and toys were shown at a conference held in Jena for kindergarten teachers, youth leaders and day-care providers and also at the Youth Welfare in Thuringia exhibition held in Weimar.

She and her partner, the actor and dancer de:Werner Siedhoff (1899–1976), moved to Dessau in 1925 with the Bauhaus. They married in 1926. She had two children with Siedhoff; the actor de:Joost Siedhoff, born 1926 and a daughter, Lore, born in 1928. Although Werner Siedhoff was not a Bauhaus student, he took part in some of the productions of Oskar Schlemmer's Stagecraft Workshop. Siedhoff-Buscher graduated in 1927 and the family remained in Dessau until 1928. After that, because of her husband's acting work, they moved a number of times. After 1927, she became a full-time wife and mother and never commercially produced any further toys or furniture, although she made furniture for the family home.

Siedhoff-Buscher was killed in a World War II air raid in Buchschlag near Frankfurt am Main on 25 September 1944.

== Legacy ==
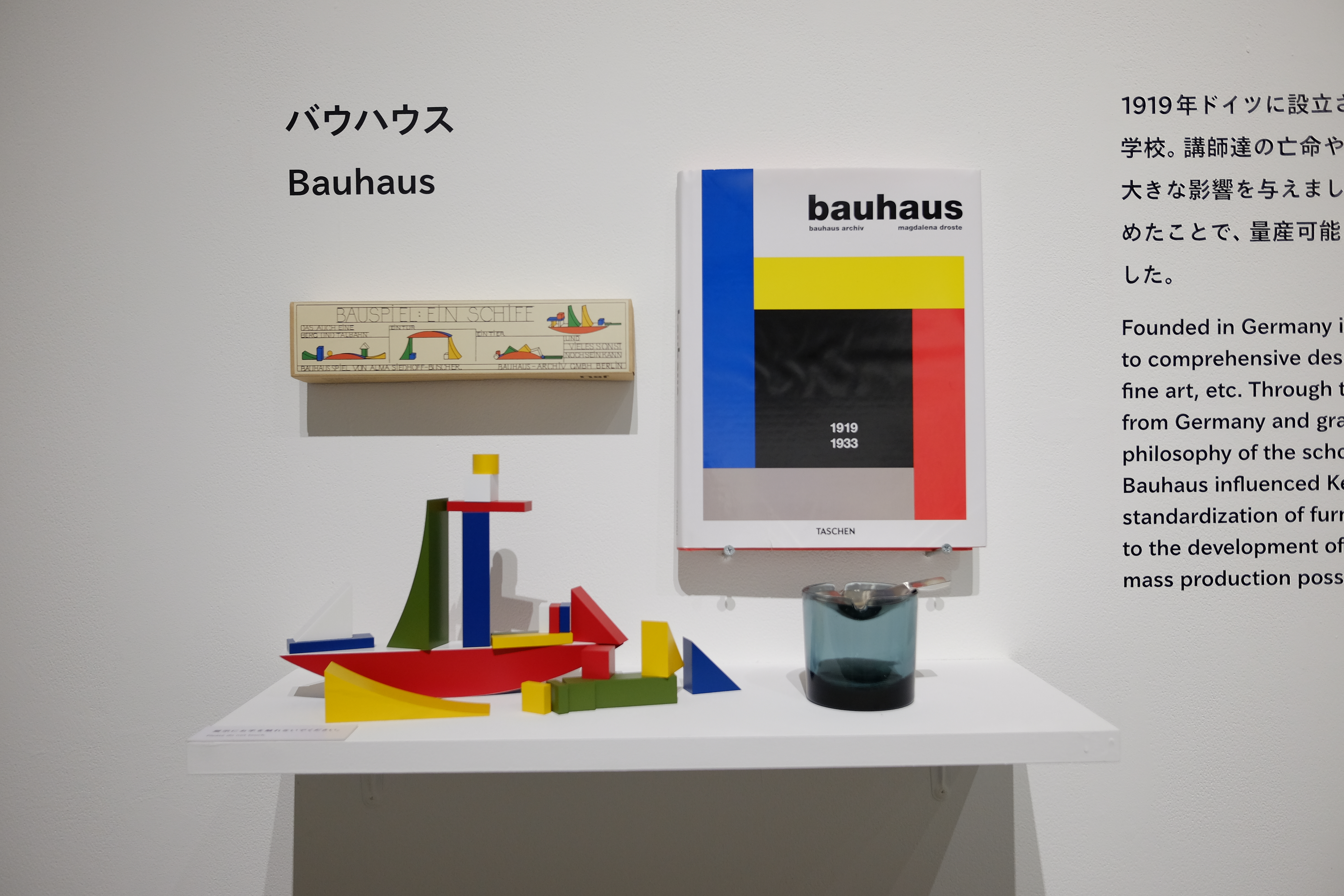
Siedhoff-Buscher's shipbuilding game at a 2016 exhibition in Tokyo.

Two of her most well known works were Kleine Schiffbauspiel ("Little ship-building game") which she made in 1923, consisting of 22 coloured wooden pieces, and Große Schiffbauspiel made in 1924, which has 39 pieces. She also created the Wurfpuppen (bendy string dolls, with wooden heads) in 1923, and, in 1927, crane and sailing boat cut out kits, which were originally published by Otto Maier-Verlag in Ravensburg. The ship building games and the cut out kits became available again in 1977.

A solo exhibition of her work, Alma Siedhoff-Buscher: Eine neue Welt für Kinder (Alma Siehoff-Buscher: a new world for children) was shown at the Bauhaus Museum, Weimar in 2004–2005 and at the Bauhaus Archive, Berlin in 2006.

The 1923 Haus am Horn, which presented a revolutionary prototype for modern living and for which Siedhoff-Buscher designed furniture, has been part of the World Heritage Site Bauhaus and its Sites in Weimar, Dessau and Bernau since 1996. In 2018 it underwent a major restoration in preparation for the 2019 celebrations of the Bauhaus centenary.

== Film ==
Lotte Brendel, the fictional lead character in the German television film Lotte am Bauhaus, first broadcast on ARD in February 2019, is loosely based on Siedhoff-Buscher.

== See also ==
- Women of the Bauhaus
