= Marta Erps-Breuer =

German artist

Marta Magdalena Elisabeth Erps-Breuer (née Erps; September 29, 1902 - June 14, 1977) was a German artist, scientific illustrator and insect researcher. After training at Bauhaus, she worked in Brazil.

== Biography ==
Marta Magdalena Elisabeth Erps was born in Frankfurt, Germany, the daughter of Friedrich A. M. Erps and Auguste Mathilde J. Erps.

Erps studied at the Bauhaus from 1921 to 1924, where she became a friend of Bauhaus founder Walter Gropius. By the time she entered, weaving was the only area of studies that remained open to women students after their first year of foundation courses. As a student in the weaving workshop under Georg Muche, Erps participated in the first Bauhaus exhibition in 1923 with a geometric textile in the Haus am Horn, which is now a World Heritage Site. The rug itself has been lost, but its general design (known from photographs) is shown in outline on the floor of the room where it was placed for the exhibition. In addition to textiles and drawings, she created sculptures, paintings, and wood carvings, few of which have survived.

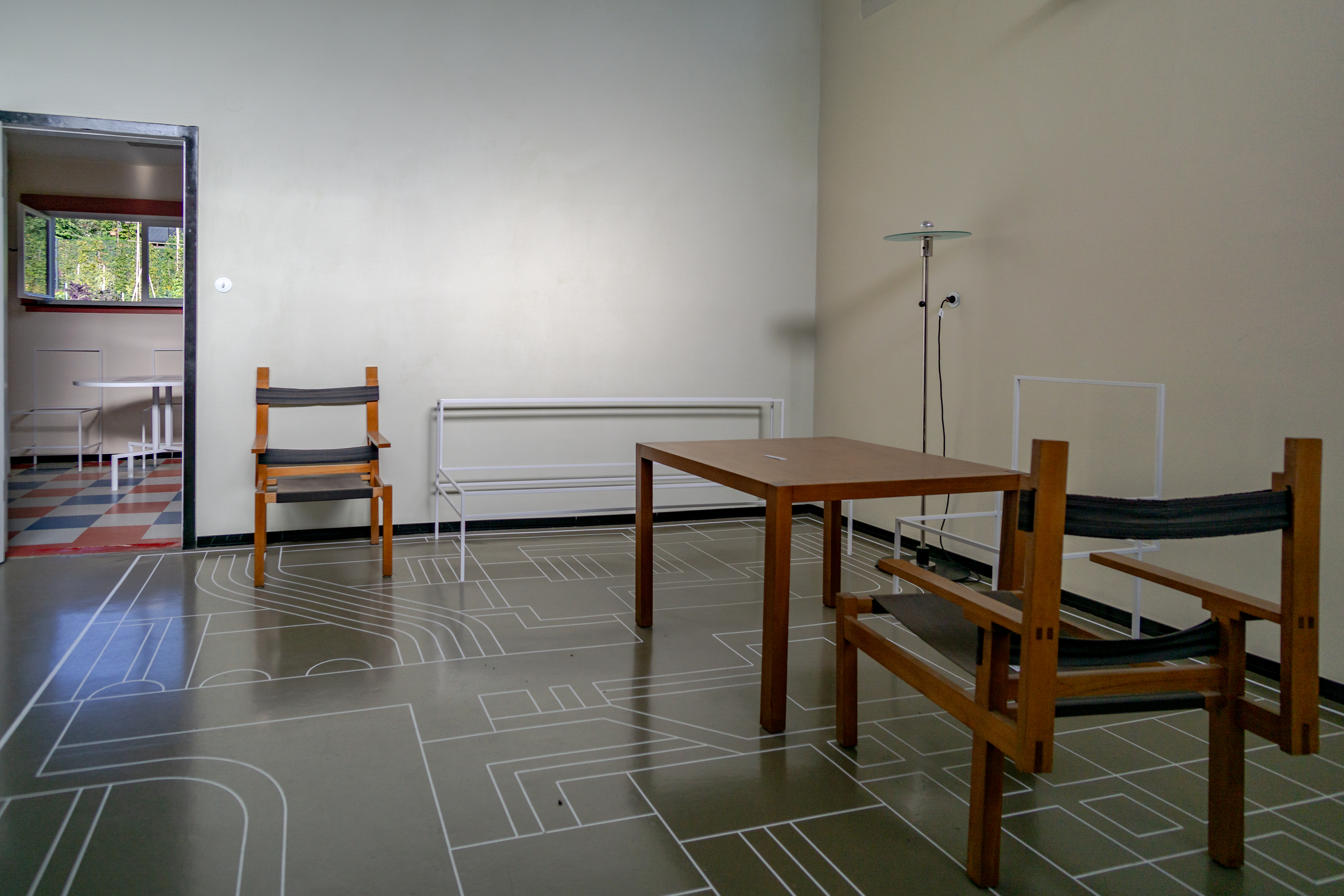
Room in the Haus am Horn showing outline of Erps-Breuer's rug for the 1923 Bauhaus exhibition

In 1925 she visited Brazil, where her brother Ludwig had relocated to become a farmer in the area south of São Paulo. She returned to Europe the following year and married the architect Marcel Breuer, who had been a fellow student at the Bauhaus, changing her last name to Erps-Breuer. They moved to Berlin in 1928, where Marcel opened an architectural and furniture design studio. In the early 1930s she decided to settle in São Paulo, Brazil, and separated permanently from her husband. They formally divorced a few years later.

After her return to Brazil, Erps-Breuer lived on her brother's farm for a few years before moving to São Paulo. There she began working as a scientific illustrator at a private research institute founded by the physicians Antonio Carini and Archimedes Busacca. She made detailed drawings of cytological and histological specimens for them. Through her collaboration with Carini and Busacca, she met University of São Paulo Professor André Dreyfus, and in 1935 she became his laboratory assistant and draftsperson in the School of Medicine. To improve her skills for this job, she returned to Europe for six months in 1936 for specialized training in making histological preparations and tissue cultures. The earliest studies in which Erps-Breuer participated, led by André Dreyfus in the 1940s, were on the wasp species Telenomus fariai and subsequently the nematode species Rhabdias fuelleborni. During this period, Erps-Breuer participated in numerous expeditions along the coast near São Paulo to make field observations and collect insects.

After the death of Dreyfus in 1952, she began working with the scientist Crodowaldo Pavan; their work uncovered connections between chromosomes and gene activation. Over the next decades, Erps-Breuer authored or coauthored twenty scientific articles stemming from her laboratory work, which primarily focused on the study of two fly genuses: Drosophila and Rhynchosciara. She published descriptions of nine species in these two genuses, five of them with Pavan. In the 1960s, she named several new species of Rhynchosciara, one of which, Rhynchosciara baschanti, honors Rudolf Baschant, an artist and botanical specimen collector who had also been at the Bauhaus in the 1920s.

She officially retired in 1969 but continued working informally for several more years before her death in 1977 in São Paulo. A carved wooden model of Drosophila melanogaster created by Erps-Breuer is still kept in the archives of the university's Department of Genetics and Evolutionary Biology, along with her notebooks and some drawings. Her surviving drawings still stand out to other scientists as exceptionally accurate and skillfully drawn.
