= Marta Astfalck-Vietz =

German photographer

- Self portrait standing nude in black halo, 1926
- Born: 21 July 1901; Dębno, Germany
- Died: 14 February 1994 (aged 92); Nienhagen, Lower Saxony, Germany
- Other name: Marta Vietz
- Spouse: Hellmuth Astfalck (m. 1929)
- Awards: Order of Merit of the Federal Republic of Germany, 1982

Marta Astfalck-Vietz (née Vietz; 21 July 1901 – 14 February 1994) was a German photographer, social worker and painter associated with the Bauhaus movement. She is remembered for her pioneering series of self-portraits from around 1930. As well as Ilse Bing, Lotte Jacobi, Marianne Breslauer, Germaine Krull, and Lucia Moholy she produced modernist images and portraits across the fields of avant-garde and commercial production, photojournalism, and fashion. Her works were rediscovered in 1991.

== Biography ==
Marta Vietz was born in Neudamm (Neumark), Germany (now: Dębno, Poland), the daughter of a printer and head of the publishing house Klassische Kunst. The family moved frequently during her schooling before settling in Berlin in 1912, where her father established a studio for fine art reproductions.

In 1929 she married the architect Hellmuth Astfalck, and continued producing photographs for publication in illustrated magazines.

== Photography ==
Born in July 1901, Vietz began her artistic studies as a student at the Kunstgewerbeschule in Berlin.

Vietz trained with the professional photographer Lutz Kloss between 1925 and 1926 and began working as an independent photographer, graphic, and advertising designer before setting up her own studio in 1927.

Vietz's works, forgotten until the 1980s, have been compared to that of her contemporaries Gertrud Arndt and Claude Cahun.

A large quantity of her archives were destroyed in 1943 during the bombing of Berlin in WWII. The remaining photographs, many of which are damaged, are held in the collection of the Berlinische Galerie – Landesmuseum für Moderne Kunst. In 1991, Janos Frecot, director of the photographic collection at the Berlinische Galerie, organized a show and exhibition catalogue of Astfalck-Vietz' works. Her work has been shown at the Harn Museum of Art, the Ludwig Museum, Cologne, the Albertina Museum, Vienna, the Pinakothek der Moderne, Munich, among other venues.

In 1982, she was awarded the Bundesverdienstkreuz am Bande (Cross of Merit on ribbon).

== Collections ==
Several of her photographs are housed in the permanent collection of the Berlinische Galerie.

== Bibliography ==
- Marta Astfalck-Vietz: Photographien 1922–1935. Catalog for the exhibition in the Berlinische Gallery 18 May – 28 July 1991, Berlin 1991
- Marta Astfalck-Vietz and Rolf Italiaander: Marta Astfalck-Vietz. 1936–1986: 50 Jahre Pflanzenporträts. Celle 1986
- Günther Dankmeyer and Volker Probst: Marta Astfalck-Vietz. Die Welt der Orchideen. Pflanzenaquarelle aus fünf Jahrzehnten. Fröhlich, Celle 1992
- Frank-Manuel Peter: „Mitgift war mir ja wurscht.“ Die Photographin Marta Astfalck-Vietz (1901–1994). In: Tanzdrama. nr. 26, 1994, p. 8–10
- Frauke Runge and Brigitte Schwettmann: Marta Astfalck-Vietz – Kunstmalerin, Kunsterziehung und Fotografin, in: Frauen aus dem Celler Land. Ein Streifzug durch die Jahrhunderte. Publ. by LEB Bildungswerk im Landkreis Celle e.V., vertreten durch Ingrid Lehmann, Ströher Druckerei & Verlag, Celle 2004, p. 83–86, ISBN 3-921744-37-7
- Marsha Meskimmon and Shearer West (eds), Visions of the "Neue Frau": Women and the Visual Arts in Weimar Germany, Scolar, Aldershot 1995, p. 76
