= Russian Orthodox Chapel, Weimar =

Funeral Chapel for the Russian Orthodox church

Coordinates: 50°58′21″N 11°19′32″E

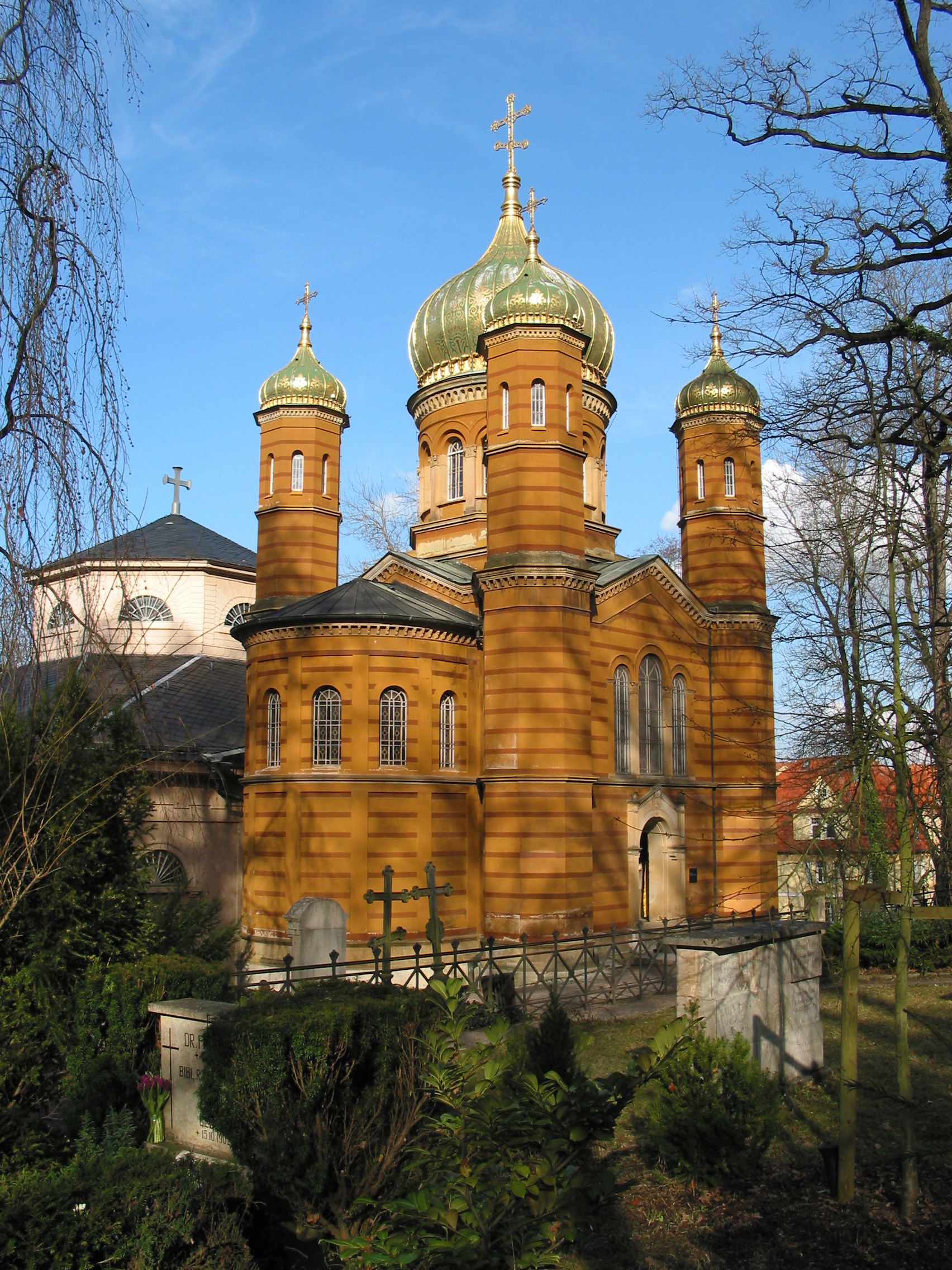
Russian Orthodox Chapel

The Russian Orthodox Chapel is a funerary chapel built in Weimar in 1860 for Grand Duchess Maria Pavlovna of Russia. It was constructed in the Historical Cemetery behind the Weimarer Fürstengruft, to which it is connected by an underground passage. Maria Pavlovna's coffin is located in the passage, with her husband Charles Frederick's coffin placed directly beside it. A spiral staircase leads to another underground connection to the Fürstengruft, though this is now closed by a metal plate.
