= Gertrud Arndt =

German photographer and textile artist, Bauhaus student

- Arndt in 1930; Mask portrait No. 13
- Born: Gertrud Hantschk; 20 September 1903; Ratibor, Upper Silesia
- Died: 10 July 2000 (aged 96); Darmstadt, Germany
- Known for: Photography
- Movement: Bauhaus
- Spouse: Alfred Arndt (m. 1927)

Gertrud Arndt (née Hantschk; 20 September 1903 – 10 July 2000) was a German photographer and designer associated with the Bauhaus movement. She is remembered for her pioneering series of self-portraits from around 1930.

== Biography ==
Born Gertrud Hantschk in Ratibor (then Upper Silesia) in September 1903, Arndt began her artistic studies as a student at the Kunstgewerbeschule in Erfurt. Her interest in photography developed while serving at an architectural office in Erfurt, where she learned darkroom techniques and began taking photographs of local buildings. None of these early photographs exist. Thanks to a scholarship, she was a student at the Bauhaus from 1923 to 1927, where she studied under László Moholy-Nagy, Wassily Kandinsky, and Paul Klee. Arndt had initially hoped to study architecture, however, she felt lost as the only woman in the construction course. She instead enrolled in the weaving workshop, where she studied under the tutelage of Georg Muche and Günta Stölzl. She believed that studying weaving was the only way she could continue her studies at the Bauhaus as a woman. Her most famous carpet – which has not survived – lay in the office of Walter Gropius from 1924 onwards. She qualified as a journeyman before the weavers guild in Glauchau, Saxony in 1927.

Later that year, she married fellow student, and architect, Alfred Arndt, who was appointed full-time master of the Bauhaus construction workshop in Dessau in 1929. Although no longer a student, Arndt remained active in Bauhaus events and enrolled in Walter Peterhan's newly created photography course. Without full-time work, Arndt embraced photography as a means to stave off her boredom. In the next five years producing a series of 43 self-portraits as well as images of her friend Otti Berger. In 1932, the couple moved to Probstzella in Thuringia, where Alfred worked as a free-lance architect. In 1948 they settled in Soviet-occupied Darmstadt, and by 1950 were again in contact with other former Bauhaus members. In those post war years, interest in the Bauhaus quickly rose again. In 1979 Arndt received international acclaim when her photographs were exhibited at Museum Folkwang. She returned to Dessau in 1994, invited by the Vorwerk company to discuss new line of rugs based on designs exclusively by women. Gertud Arndt died in July 2000 at the age of ninety-six. Ever playful, she suggested that her friends and family "celebrate a joyful Bauhaus party" after her death.

== Photography ==
Arndt's photography, forgotten until the 1980s, has been compared to that of her contemporaries Marta Astfalck-Vietz and Claude Cahun. Over the five years when she took an active interest in photography, she captured herself and her friends in various styles, costumes and settings in the series known as Maskenportäts (Masked Portraits). Although at the time Arndt refused to attribute any deep artistic meaning to her photographs, they were imaginative and provocative. Through her costumes, Arndt created playful reinterpretations of such feminine tropes as the widow, socialite, and a little girl. Writing for Berlin Art Link, Angela Connor describes the images as "ranging from severe to absurd to playful." Arndt's photographic style itself was likewise unique, and defied the usual aspects of modernist photography, which often included extreme angles, constructivist mirroring, or geometric simplifications. Instead the viewer is confronted with Arndt head on, unable to ignore the expression communicated by her face and the accessories that framed it. In an interview as a nonagenarian, Arndt told Sabina Leßmann, "I am simply interested in the face, what does one make from a face? There you only need to open your eyes wide and already you are someone else. Isn't that true?" Today Arndt is considered to be a pioneer of female self-portraiture, her work echoing in that of Cindy Sherman and Sophie Calle.

== Exhibition ==
In January 2013, the Bauhaus-Archiv / Museum für Gestaltung in Tiergarten (Berlin) presented an exhibition of Gertrud Arndt's textiles and photographs. Arndt's work was included in the 2021 exhibition Women in Abstraction at the Centre Pompidou.

== Selected works ==
- Self-Portrait with Sunglasses, Dessau, 1928, National Gallery of Art, Washington DC

== Literature ==
- Arndt, Alfred; Leistner, Gerhard; Arndt, Gertrud (1991). Alfred Arndt, Gertrud Arndt: zwei Künstler aus dem Bauhaus. Museum Ostdeutsche Galerie Regensburg, 8. Juni-14. Juli 1991. Das Museum. ISBN 978-3-89188-056-2.
- Leßmann, Sabina (1994). Gertrud Arndt: Photographien der Bauhaus-Künstlerin; Das Verborgene Museum, Berlin, 20. Januar bis 13. März 1994. Das Verborgene Museum.
- Leßmann, Sabina. "Die Maske der Weiblichkeit nimmt kuriose Formen an... (The Mask of Femininity Takes on Curious Forms). In Eskildsen, Ute. Fotografieren hieß teilnehmen. Richter, 1994.
- Ute, Eskildsen (1995). "A Chance to Participate: A Transitional Time for Women Photographer" in Visions of the 'Neue Frau': Women and the Visual Arts in Weimar Germany. Aldershot, England; Brookfield, Vermont: Scolar Press; Ashgate Publishing Company. ISBN 978-1-85928-157-4.
