= Bauhaus Museum Weimar =

Bauhaus museum in Weimar, Germany

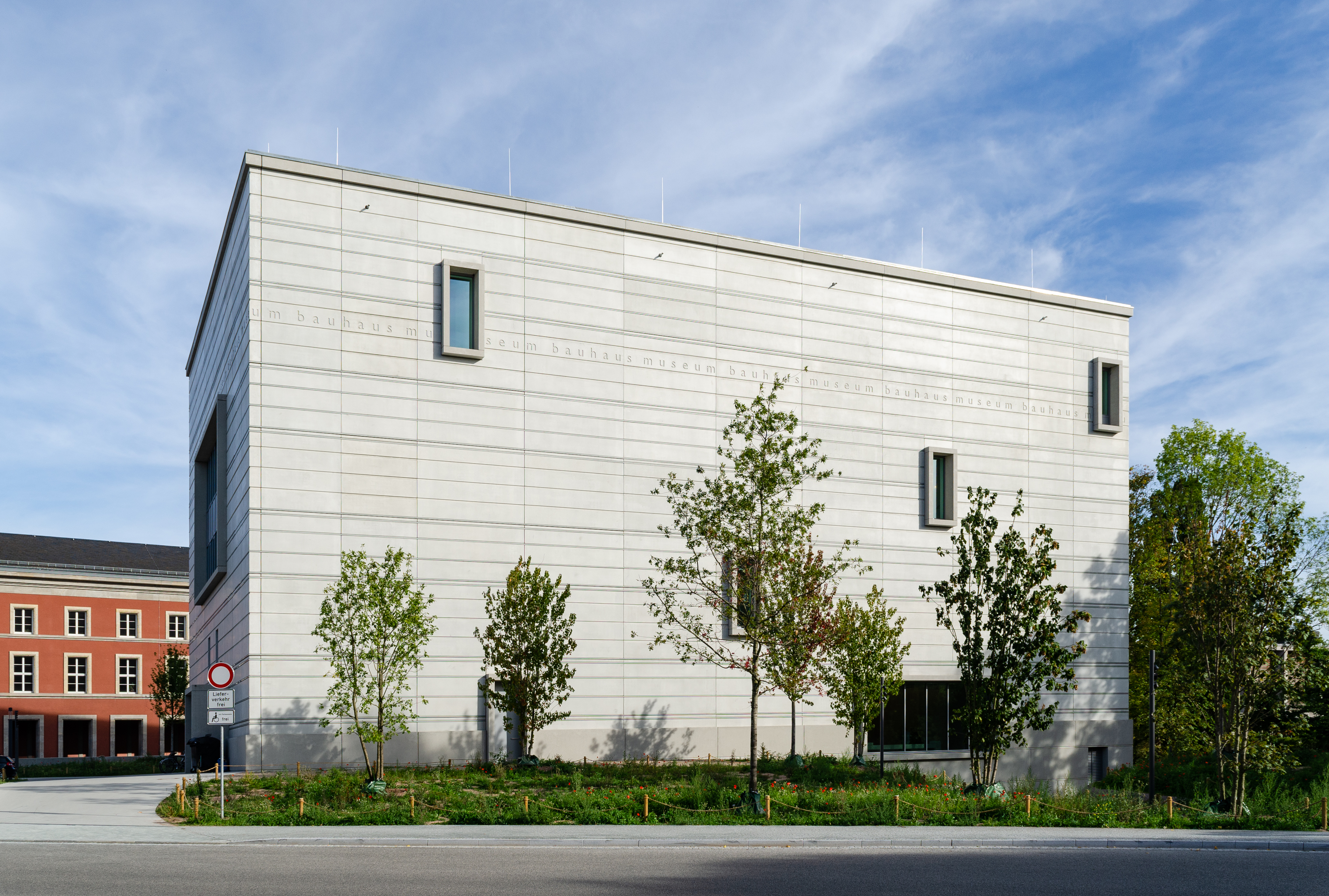
- Weimar, Bauhaus-Museum, 2019
- Established: 1995
- Location: Weimar, Germany
- Coordinates: 50°59′06″N 11°19′27″E
- Director: Klassik Stiftung Weimar
- Website: klassik-stiftung.de/bauhaus-museum-weimar

The Bauhaus Museum Weimar is a museum dedicated to the Bauhaus design movement located in Weimar, Germany. It presents the Weimar collections of the State Bauhaus, which was founded in the town in 1919. The museum is a project of the Klassik Stiftung Weimar and is located near the Weimarhallenpark. Originally opened in 1995, it is now housed in a new building since April 2019.

== Collection ==
The basis and distinctive feature of the Bauhaus Museum is the historic collections of the Klassik Stiftung Weimar highlighting the background, history and lasting influence of the State Bauhaus, founded in Weimar in 1919. The collection of pieces originating from the formative years of the most important school of architecture and design of the 20th century has grown enormously with numerous purchases and donations since 1990. The Gropius Collection, owned by the Klassik Stiftung Weimar, is the world's oldest collection of original Bauhaus works. The collection was significantly expanded with the acquisition of the Ludewig Collection in 2010, which contained 1,500 objects of functional design dating from 1780 to the present, including important Bauhaus works.

Aside from the Bauhaus Archive in Berlin, the Bauhaus collection in Weimar is one of the world's most important in terms of size and quality.

== History ==
=== Provisional museum ===
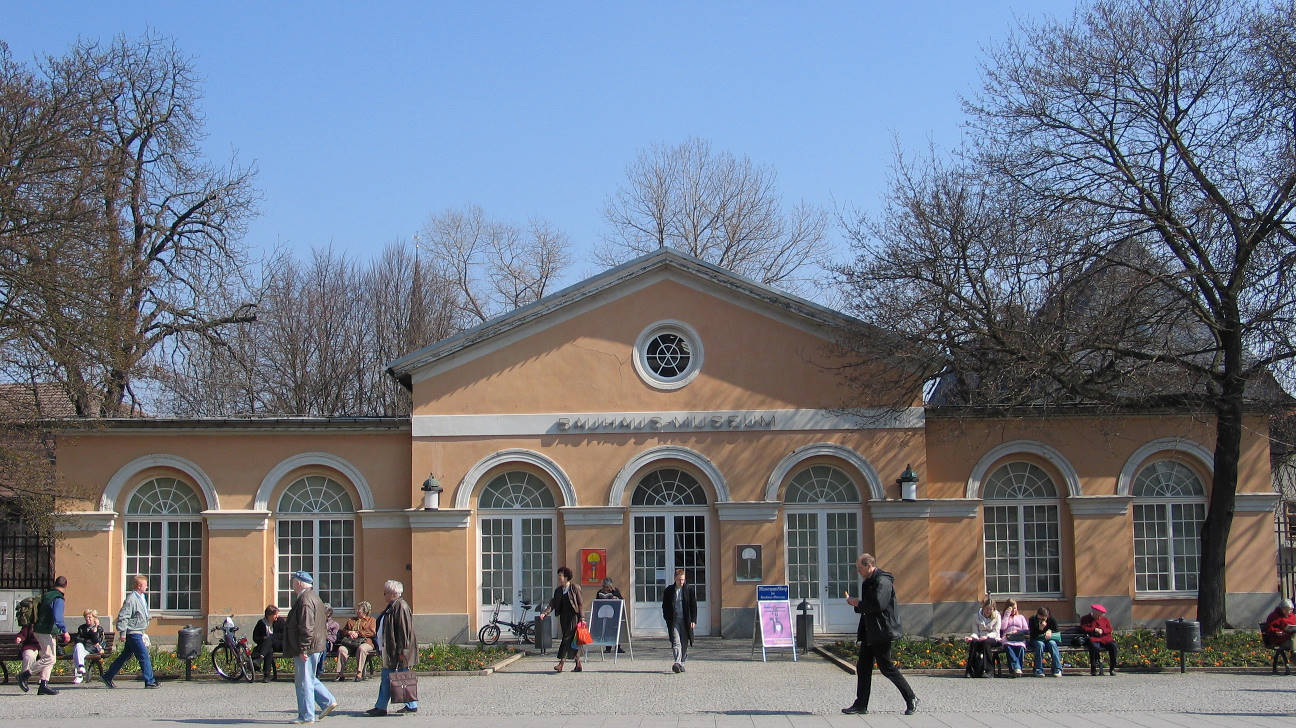
The provisional Bauhaus Museum

In 1995, a provisional Bauhaus Museum was housed in a former coach house on Theaterplatz rebuilt by Clemens Wenzeslaus Coudray. It includes ruins of the Weimarer Zeughaus or arsenal.

It displayed about 250 works by teachers and students of the Bauhaus school (1919–1933), including seminal works by Walter Gropius, Johannes Itten, Lyonel Feininger , Gunta Stölzl and Marcel Breuer, along with several works from the movement's precursor, the 1907 Henry van de Velde School.

=== Towards a new museum ===
The construction of the new Bauhaus Museum was made possible with funding procured through a special funding programme created by federal and state authorities in July 2008.

Because the new Bauhaus Museum was going to have a strong impact on future urban planning decisions, all the potential sites for the museum in downtown Weimar were carefully assessed before the review board selected the Weimarhallenpark in April 2010.

According to the specifications provided by the Klassik Stiftung Weimar, the museum displays artistic and aesthetic positions of the modern and contemporary period in Weimar and include space for presenting the most current developments. With a transdisciplinary focus, the museum features works of fine art, design and architecture.

In an international architectural design competition, organised by the Klassik Stiftung Weimar, architectural offices around the world submitted proposals for the new Bauhaus Museum. The winning proposal was announced in March 2012.

The total investment in the project amounts to approximately 22 million euros. A total of 14.5 million euros has been allocated to covering the cost of constructing the museum.

=== Architectural design competition ===
The architectural design competition for the new Bauhaus Museum was launched by the board of trustees of the Klassik Stiftung Weimar on 14 July 2011. The open international competition, jointly organised by the Klassik Stiftung Weimar and the city of Weimar, consisted of two rounds. The goal of the first round was to find an appropriate location for the new Bauhaus Museum in the complex urban setting of downtown Weimar. On 1 November 2011, the jury selected 27 applicants for the second round. They were asked to submit a more detailed urban-planning, architectural and interior design concept for the new Bauhaus Museum. The jury had seventeen members and was supported by a panel of twelve independent experts. The competition was managed by Schubert/Horst Architekten, Dresden.

A total of 2,189 architects from 60 countries registered to participate in the open international competition. Out of these, 2,039 came from 32 European countries, 1,151 of whom came from Germany. By the beginning of October 2011, 536 participants had submitted their proposals. The Klassik Stiftung Weimar insisted on this complex procedure in order to find an architecturally innovative, sustainable, energy-efficient and museologically sound solution for the new Bauhaus Museum that takes full advantage of the urban-planning potential of the Weimarhallenpark. All the submitted proposals remained anonymous to ensure objectivity.

On 16 March 2012 the international jury awarded two second-place and two third-place prizes and conferred three honourable mentions. The announcement of the winners officially concluded the architectural design competition. The two second-place prizes went to Johann Bierkandt (Landau) and the architects HKR (Klaus Krauss and Rolf Kursawe, Cologne). The two third-place prizes went to Heike Hanada with Benedict Tonon (Berlin), who were eventually appointed as principal architects, and Bube/Daniela Bergmann (Rotterdam). Three honourable mentions were awarded to the proposals by Karl Hufnagel Architekten (Berlin), hks Hestermann Rommel Architekten und Gesamtplaner GmbH (Erfurt), and menomenopiu architectures/Alessandro Balducci (Rome).

The Klassik Stiftung Weimar then began negotiating with the four prize winners according to VOF procedure (Contracting Regulations for the Awarding of Professional Services). The jury provided the winners with recommendations for optimising their proposals in preparation for the VOF procedure.

All proposals of the second round of the competition are displayed at the Neues Museum in Weimar.

=== Opening ===
The new museum opened in April 2019.
