= Alfred Arndt =

German architect

- Born: 1896; Elbing
- Died: 1976 (aged 79–80); Darmstadt
- Occupation: Architect
- Buildings: Bauer residence, Haus des Volkes (Community centre)

Alfred Arndt (1896 Elbing – 1976 Darmstadt) was a German architect. He was a student at the Bauhaus art school from 1921 to 1927 and from 1930 to 1931 he was Master of the Building and Interior Design Department at the school. From 1931 to 1932 he taught interior design, illustrative geometry and perspective at the Bauhaus. In 1927 he married the Bauhaus trained photographer Gertrud Arndt (1903–2000). They had a daughter, Alexandra, born in 1931. In 1948 they moved to Darmstadt.

== Buildings ==
- 1927–1928 Bauer residence, Probstzella, Thuringia
- 1926–1933 Haus des Volkes (Community centre), Probstzella, Thuringia

== See also ==
- Konrad Püschel
