= Georg Muche =

German painter (1895–1987)

- Muche in 1926
- Born: 8 May 1895; Querfurt, German Empire
- Died: 26 March 1987 (aged 91); Lindau, West Germany
- Known for: Painting, printmaking

Georg Muche (8 May 1895 – 26 March 1987) was a German painter, printmaker, architect, author, and teacher.

== Early life and education ==
Georg Muche was born on 8 May 1895 in Querfurt, in the Prussian Province of Saxony, and grew up in the Rhön area. His father, Felix Muche, was a naïve painter and art collector who was known as Felix Ramholz.

Muche's art studies began in 1913 in Munich at the School for Painting and the Graphic Arts which had been founded by Anton Ažbe and was then owned by Paul Weinhold and Felix Eisengräber. In 1914 he applied to the Royal Bavarian Academy of Fine Arts in Munich, but failed the entrance examination. His study of painting resumed in 1915, with Martin Brandenburg, when he moved to Berlin. At this time he had already been influenced by Wassily Kandinsky and Max Ernst, and became one of the earliest proponents of abstract art in Germany.

== Work ==
=== Sturm ===
In Berlin, Muche became associated with Herwarth Walden and his Sturm artist group, working as Walden's exhibition assistant at the Sturm Gallery. He also taught painting at the Sturm Art School from 1916 to 1920. Muche's exposure to the Expressionist world influenced him to become more unconventional in his work, creating abstractions that combined elements of Cubism with the colour ideals of Der Blaue Reiter and Marc Chagall. He participated in three exhibitions from 1916 to 1918, each of which paired his work with that another artists: Max Ernst (1916), Paul Klee, and Alexander Archipenko (1918). From 1913 to 1923, Muche produced prints which showed a strong influence by Klee, as well as Marc Chagall.

His art career was interrupted with a one-year stint in the military, serving on the Western Front in 1917 during World War I.

=== Bauhaus ===
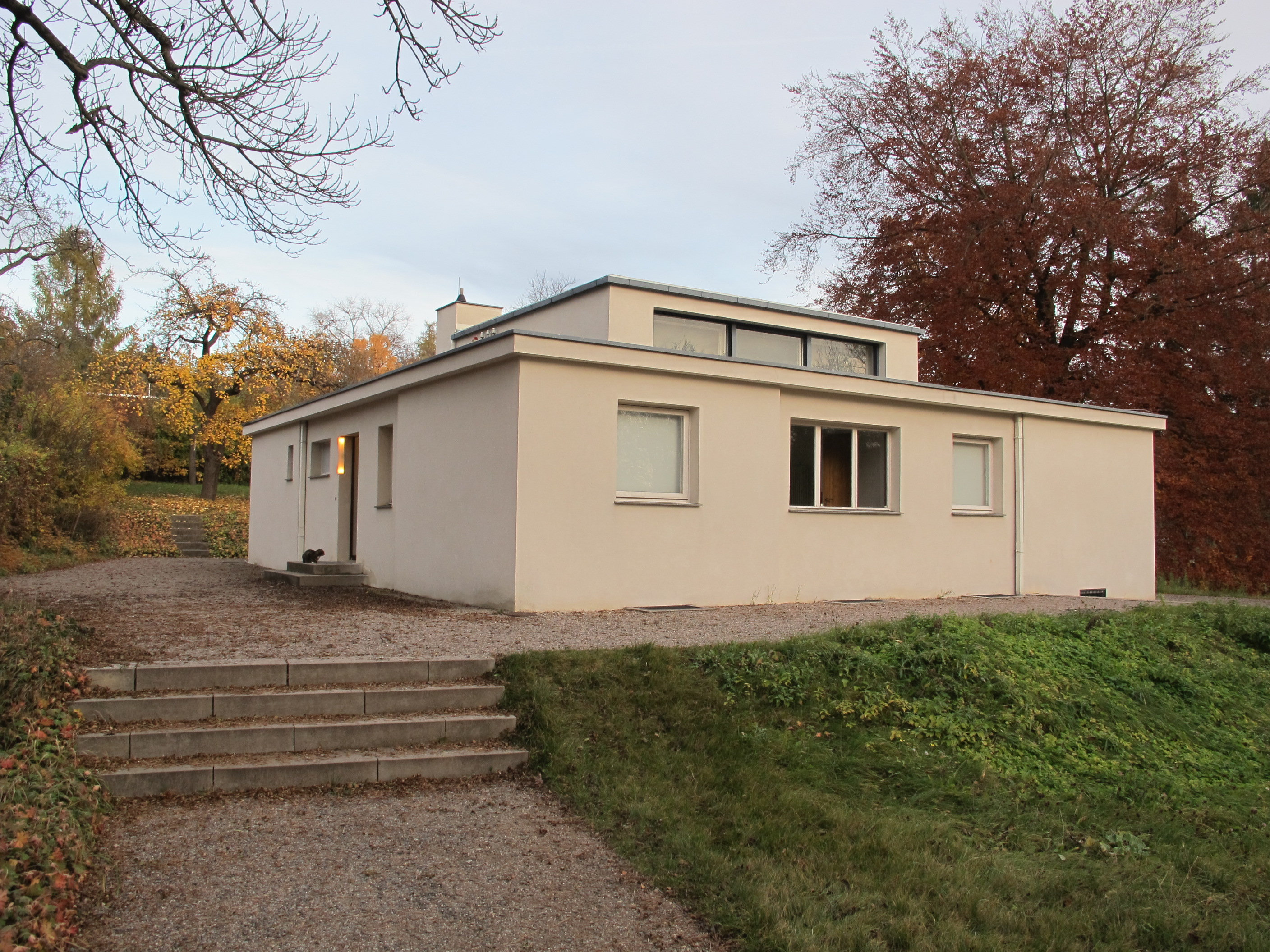
Haus am Horn, built 1923

Walter Gropius invited Muche in 1919 to join the Bauhaus art school in Weimar. At the urging of Lyonel Feininger, he accepted, becoming the youngest Master of Form. Herwarth Walden had given him a five-year contract with Sturm in 1917, but Muche dissolved it prematurely to gain some independence for his Bauhaus work.

At Bauhaus, he headed the weaving workshop from 1919 to 1925 and directed the preliminary course from 1921 to 1922. Muche married Elsa (El) Franke, who was a Bauhaus student, in 1922. After 1922 his style evolved from pure abstraction towards more figurative and organic leanings, a sort of lyric surrealism.

Muche was in charge of the 1923 Bauhaus Exhibition, their first major exhibition, for which he designed an experimental house known as "Haus am Horn". It was constructed in 1923 as the first practical implementation of the new Bauhaus building style. Such principles were key influences on 20th-century architecture. Haus am Horn was designed to showcase economical housing, providing a functional design using prefabricated materials for quick and inexpensive construction. The house, which demonstrates a keen understanding of the use of space, has been called "a true artwork of the realization of abstract monumental beauty". In 1996 the Haus am Horn became part of the World Heritage Site now called the Bauhaus and its Sites in Weimar, Dessau and Bernau. Muche was the leading proponent of the Bauhaus architectural group. In 1926 he, along with Richard Paulick, designed the innovative Stahlhaus (Steel House) at Dessau-Törten. From 1925 to 1927 he headed the Bauhaus' weaving workshop in Dessau.

=== After Bauhaus ===
Muche left the Bauhaus in 1927 to join the faculty of Johannes Itten's Modern Art School of Berlin, where he taught until 1930. For 1929's 10 Years of the November Group Exhibition, Muche oversaw the abstract and constructive design and architecture departments. Starting in 1931, until he was dismissed by the Nazis in 1933, he was a professor at the State Academy for Art and Applied Arts in Breslau, where he taught with Oskar Schlemmer. He then resumed teaching in Berlin, at the School for Art and Work, under the directorship of Hugo Häring. He remained there until 1938.

Thirteen Muche paintings and two prints were confiscated from museums by the Nazis and at least two of those works were displayed in the 1937 Munich exhibition Entartete Kunst (Degenerate Art). This exhibit was intended to inflame public opinion against modernism, which was presented as a conspiracy by people who hated German decency, and to incite revulsion against the "perverse Jewish spirit" penetrating German culture, although only six of the 112 artists included in the exhibition were in fact Jewish.

After spending some time in Italy, Muche wrote a book, Buon Fresco – Briefe aus Italien über Handwerk und Stil der echten Freskomalerei, on fresco painting. He exhibited his own frescoes at a Berlin gallery. From 1939 to 1958 Muche was on the faculty of the School for Textile Engineers in Krefeld, holding the position of artist director of the Master Class for Textile Art. He also worked in Wuppertal at an institute developing painting materials. His associates there included Oskar Schlemmer and Willi Baumeister.

He settled in Lindau, on the eastern side of Lake Constance, in 1960. There he continued his painting and graphic art work as a freelancer. His work in the 1970s included a series of paintings and drawings making up the Tafel der Schuld (Panels of Guilt). In 1979 he was awarded the Lovis Corinth Prize by the city of Regensburg. In 1980 Berlin's Bauhaus Archive assembled an extensive retrospective, Georg Muche – Das künstlerische Werk 1912–1927. Muche died in Lindau on 26 March 1987.

Für Wilhelm Runge, a painting by Muche, was featured on a 1996 German postage stamp as part of a series of stamps honoring German painting of the 20th century.

== Collections ==
Muche's work is in the collections of many museums, including Los Angeles County Museum of Art, Museum of Modern Art (New York), Harvard Art Museums, Museum of Fine Arts (Boston), Brooklyn Museum, Neue Nationalgalerie (Berlin), and Kunstmuseum Bonn.
