= Klassik Stiftung Weimar =

Cultural institution in Weimar, Germany

Coordinates: 50°58′23″N 11°19′34″E

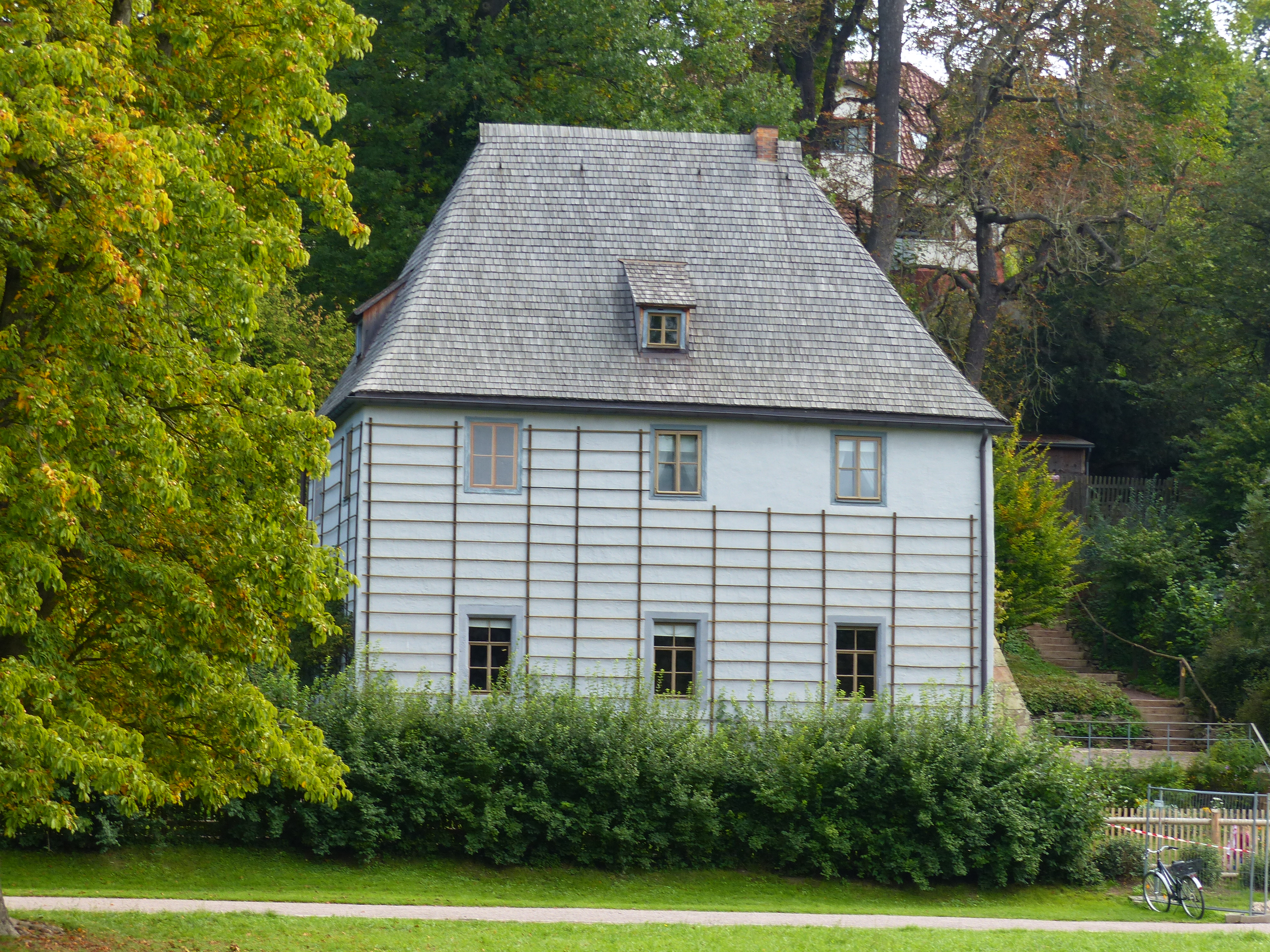
Goethe's Garden House, Weimar, one of the foundation's World Heritage listed properties

The Klassik Stiftung Weimar (roughly "Weimar Classicism Foundation") is one of the largest and most significant cultural institutions in Germany. It owns more than 20 museums, palaces, historic houses and parks, as well as literary and art collections, a number of which are World Heritage Sites.

It focuses on the Weimar Classicism period (most famously associated with Johann Wolfgang Goethe and Friedrich Schiller), but also covers 19th and 20th century art and culture with properties associated with Franz Liszt, Friedrich Nietzsche, Henry van de Velde and the Bauhaus.

Eleven of its properties are listed as part of the Classical Weimar World Heritage Site and the Haus am Horn is part of the Bauhaus and its Sites in Weimar, Dessau and Bernau World Heritage Site.

The foundation was created on 1 January 2003 through the merger of the Stiftung Weimarer Klassik (Weimar Classics Foundation, successor to East Germany's "National Research and Memorial Centres of Classical German Literature in Weimar") and the Kunstsammlungen zu Weimar (Weimar Art Collections). It was known from 2003 to 2006 as the Stiftung Weimarer Klassik und Kunstsammlungen.

The Klassik Stiftung Weimar is a member of the Konferenz Nationaler Kultureinrichtungen, a union of more than twenty cultural institutions in the five new states of Germany which were formerly part of the German Democratic Republic.

== Weimarer Fürstengruft and Historical Cemetery ==
The Weimarer Fürstengruft is the ducal burial chapel of Saxe-Weimar-Eisenach and is located in the Historical Cemetery (Historischer Friedhof Weimar). It houses the tombs of Goethe and Schiller. It is part of the Klassik Stiftung Weimar and since 1998 it and the cemetery have been part of the Classical Weimar World Heritage Site. The cemetery also houses the Monument to the March Dead.

== Gallery ==
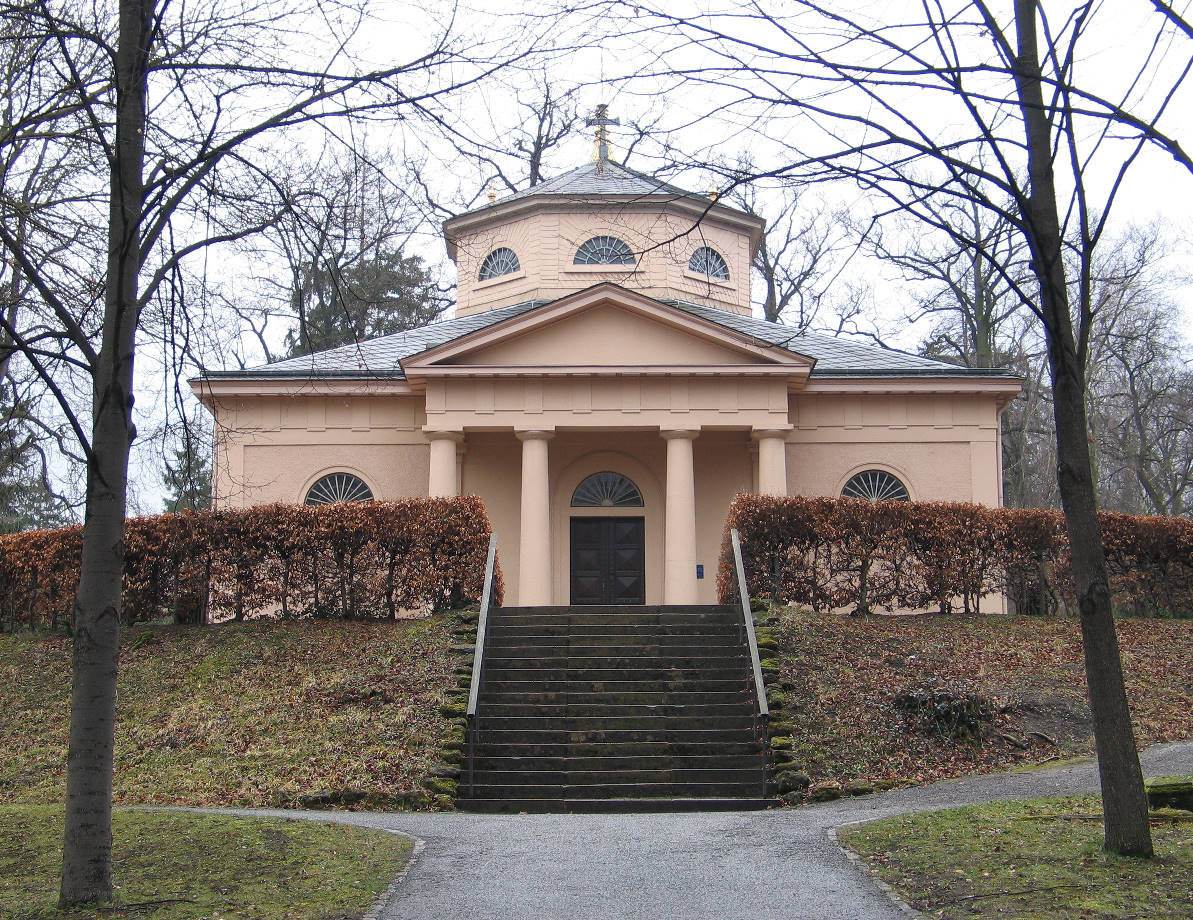
The Fürstengruft from the north

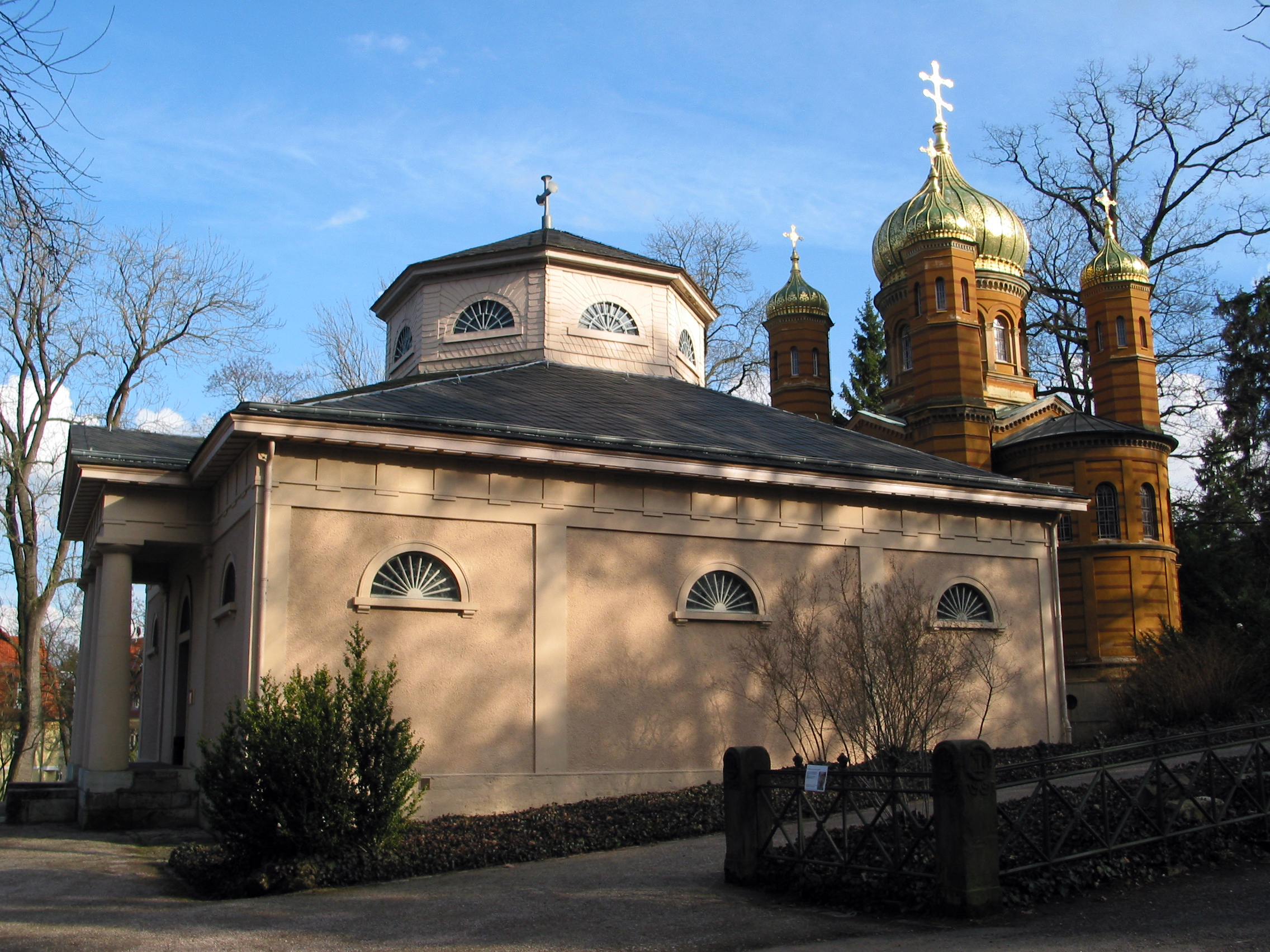
The Fürstengruft from the west, showing the Russian Orthodox Chapel behind it

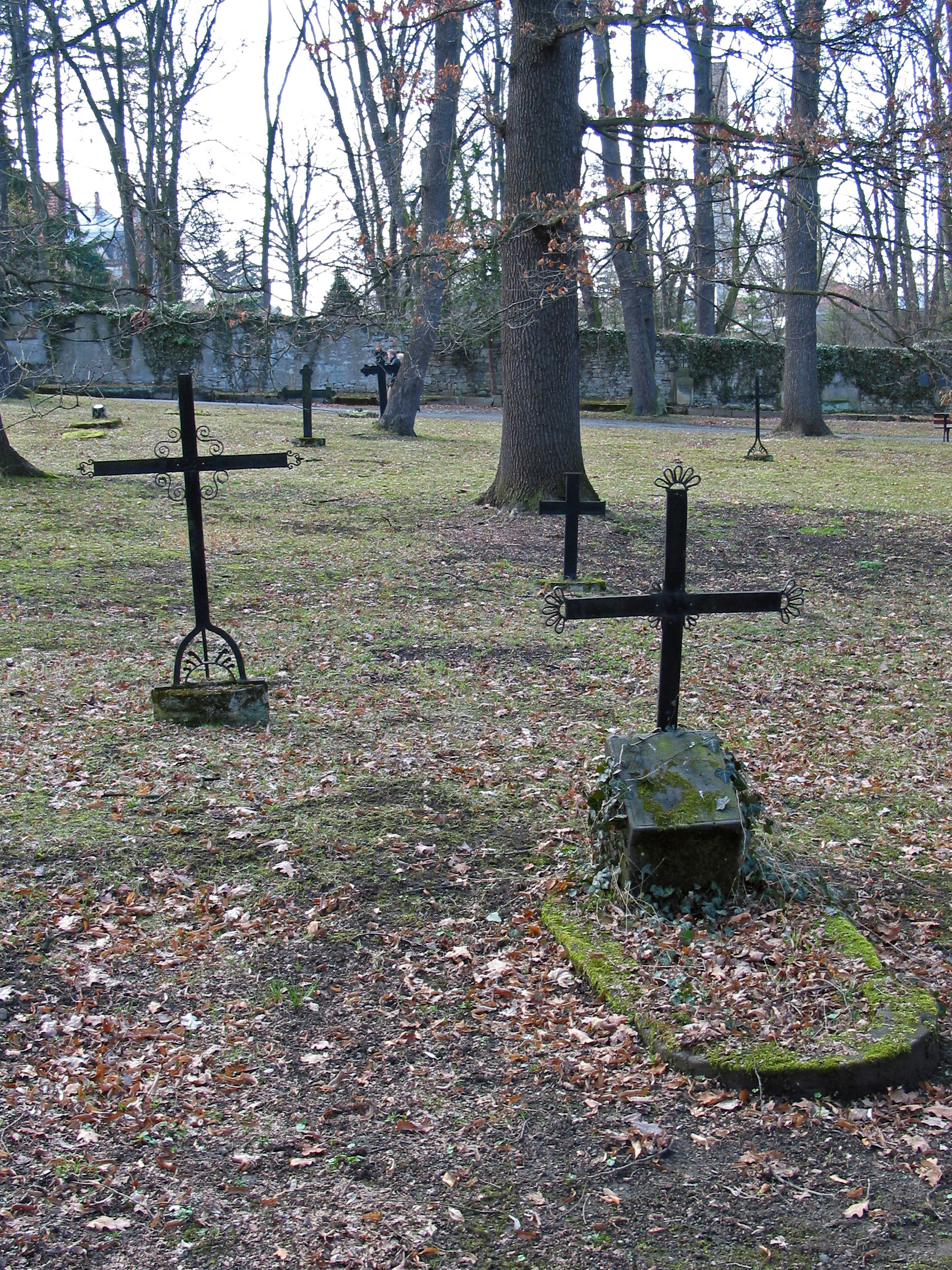
Graves in the west half of the cemetery
