= Peterhans =

Peterhans is a German surname. Notable people with the surname include:

- Brigitte Peterhans (1928-2021), German-American architect
- Josef Peterhans (1882–1960), German actor
- Katrin Peterhans, Swiss female curler, European champion
- Walter Peterhans (1897–1960), German photographer and Bauhaus teacher
