= Gertrude Kerbis =

American architect

Gertrude Lempp Kerbis (august 23,1926 – June 14, 2016) was an American modernist architect. Kerbis' education includes studying at Wright Junior College, University of Wisconsin, University of Illinois, Harvard University, and Illinois Institute of Technology. She studied under and worked for several significant modernists of her day, including Walter Gropius, Ludwig Mies Van Der Rohe, and Carl Koch. Kerbis worked at Skidmore, Ownings & Merrill and C.F. Murphy Associates before establishing her own firm, Lempp Kerbis, in Chicago 1967. Her work entails that interior design can also be viewed as architecture and not just the aesthetic of a space. She was a lead designer in several major works of American modernism, including the Lustron house for a MoMA competition, Mitchell Hall at the US Air Force Academy, the Seven Continents Restaurant at the O'Hare International Airport Rotunda, and the Skokie Public Library in Skokie, Illinois. Kerbis founded the Chicago Women in Architecture group in 1974. She was a member of the American Institute of Architects, and notably became an AIA Fellow in 1970.

== Life and education ==
Gertrude Lempp Kerbis was born and raised in the Northwest side of Chicago, Illinois. Her parents, Eugene and Emma Lempp, were working class immigrants from southern Germany and Belarus, respectively. Growing up, Kerbis attended Chicago public schools and graduated from Foreman High School. She attended Wright Junior College and then transferred to the University of Wisconsin–Madison when her family temporarily moved to Wisconsin. Kerbis was inspired to pursue architecture after reading an article on Frank Lloyd Wright and then visiting Taliesin East. At the time, there was no architecture program at the University of Wisconsin so Kerbis transferred to the School of Architecture at the University of Illinois Urbana-Champaign, where she studied architectural engineering and received her BS in 1948. She went on to study architecture at the Harvard Graduate School of Design under Walter Gropius. Kerbis moved back to Chicago to study architecture at the Illinois Institute of Technology (IIT) under Ludwig Mies van der Rohe, receiving her master's degree in 1954. While attending IIT she met Walter Peterhans and they got married and had a son named Julian. They divorced a short while after, and she later remarried tennis professional Donald Kerbis, who had a daughter named Lisa from a previous marriage. Together they had a daughter named Kim.

== Career ==
=== Employment ===
While studying at Harvard University, Kerbis began her first job working in the studio of Carl Koch. Upon graduating from Illinois Institute of Technology in 1954, Kerbis was hired by Walter Netsch to work for Skidmore, Owings & Merrill. At SOM, Kerbis designed Mitchell Hall and the Skokie Public Library, and worked on the firm's office. Kerbis worked at SOM until 1959 and then began working for C.F. Murphy Associates, where she designed the Seven Continents Restaurant and worked on the firm's office as well. She worked at C.F. Murphy Associates until 1963. In 1967, Kerbis started her own firm, Lempp Kerbis. She also taught Harper Community College in Palatine, Illinois for 25 years.

=== Design style ===
Long-span structures and custom-designed manufactured components are characteristic of Kerbis’ work. She particularly liked developing structures that would allow for column-free, open plans, creating interior spaces full of possibility. Some of her most successful implementations of this modern style include Mitchell Hall and the Seven Continents Restaurant. Kerbis intentionally focused on structure and chose not to be concerned with furniture or finishes in order to establish herself as a woman architect, not an interior designer.

=== Projects ===
- Mitchell Hall, US Air Force Academy, Colorado Springs, Colorado
- Skokie Public Library, Skokie, Illinois
- Seven Continents Restaurant, The Rotunda Building at O'Hare International Airport, Chicago, Illinois
- Don Kerbis Tennis Club, Highland Park, Chicago
- Greenhouse Condominium, 2131 N. Clark St., Chicago
- Lake Meadows Clubhouse

=== Project awards ===
- 1960, American Institute of Architects Citation of Merit, Lake Meadows Clubhouse
- 1962, American Institute of Architects Honor Award, Skokie Public Library
- 1976, American Institute of Architects Distinguished Building Award, Greenhouse Condominium

=== Professional honors and awards ===
- 1970, 11th woman elected to American Institute of Architects College of Fellows
- 2008, Lifetime Achievement Award from the American Institute of Architects Chicago Chapter
- 2014, Exhibit launched by Chicago Architecture Foundation: Women Build Change to celebrate the 40th anniversary of Chicago Women in Architecture

=== Groups ===
- Member and first female president, American Institute of Architects, Chicago Chapter
- Founder, Chicago Women in Architecture, 1973
- Member and president, Cliff Dwellers Club, Chicago
- Member, Chicago Architectural Club
