= Neues Sehen =

1920s Bauhaus-influenced art movement in photography

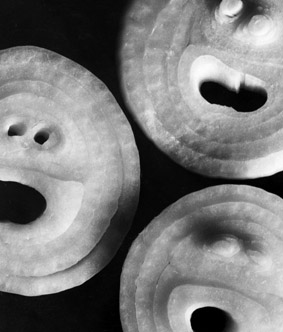
Carnival masks, or three sliced onions, by Elsa Thiemann, 1930s

The Neues Sehen, also known as New Vision or Neue Optik, was a movement, not specifically restricted to photography, which was developed in the 1920s. The movement was directly related to the principles of the Bauhaus. Neues Sehen considered photography to be an autonomous artistic practice with its own laws of composition and lighting, through which the lens of the camera becomes a second eye for looking at the world. This way of seeing was based on the use of unexpected framings, the search for contrast in form and light, the use of high and low camera angles, etc. The movement was contemporary with New Objectivity with which it shared a defence of photography as a specific medium of artistic expression, although Neues Sehen favoured experimentation and the use of technical means in photographic expression.

== History ==
The inter-war years saw a significant change in the field of photography. On one hand, there was a reaction against the painterly approach; on the other, there was a renewed interest in the new forms of artistic expression. The three main currents developed during that period were Neues Sehen, New Objectivity and straight photography. All of them favoured specificity in the photographic medium and its separation from painting. They stood against the photographic associations that were striving to preserve painterly models, accusing them of being unsubstantial, having a narrow outlook limited to their own assumptions, and producing images that were unattractive and removed from reality.

Neues Sehen was also criticised by the defenders of straight photography and New Objectivity for being too experimental, inconsistent, and producing amateur photography of poor technical standards. To defend themselves against the latter, they created classes of pure photography at the Bauhaus school and evolved toward ever-greater objectivity in photography.

The movement was formed mainly by young Russian Constructivists such as Alexander Rodchenko and the Bauhaus teachers László Moholy-Nagy and Walter Peterhans. Bauhaus students highly influenced by the Neues Sehen included Elsa Thiemann, Ivana Tomljenović-Meller, Iwao Yamawaki, Erich Consemüller and Andreas Feininger. Moholy-Nagy's wife, Lucia Moholy, was also a noted Neues Sehen photographer. Their stylistic resources included unexpected angles, experimenting with light and shadows to produce large dark areas in the photograph, the use of photomontage and collage, and photographic composition according to the strict principles of perception of the Bauhaus. Creativity was more developed in the subject matter and in the new way of interpreting the photographic image.

The works are usually didactic since they force the viewer to confront images that are not easily recognisable as elements of reality. Consequently, these are works of uneven quality and experimental nature.

== Film und Foto ==
The exhibition FIFO, organised in 1929 by the Deutscher Werkbund in Stuttgart, is considered the first great exhibition of modern European and American photography. It was seen as a showcase for the artistic ideas of the New Vision. Shortly before the opening, in the autumn of 1928, László Moholy-Nagy and Sigfried Giedion, who were in charge of the main room in the exhibition, introduced a change in the initial programme and turned it into a representation of the New Vision.

The exhibition included 1,200 works by 191 artists belonging to the fields of cinema, painting, photography and the visual arts in general, and can be considered the culmination of experimental production realised with these media. In Germany it was seen as a retrospective of these fields before the rigid aesthetics of the Nazi regime was imposed.

The selection of works was made by several well known figures including Moholy-Nagy, who was one of the selectors for European photography, and Edward Weston, who was in charge of the American section. Artists included Berenice Abbott, Willi Baumeister, Marcel Duchamp, Hein Gorny, Hannah Höch, Eugène Atget, Man Ray, Alexander Rodchenko, Edward Steichen, Imogen Cunningham, Irene Bayer-Hecht, Charles Sheeler and Brett Weston, among others. The selected works were characterised by unexpected angles, such as the photographs taken by Willi Ruge from a parachute, the use of photomontage, etc. After seeing the exhibition, the critic Franz Roh wrote an essay entitled Foto-Auge (Photo-eye), asserting that photography had changed in a definitive manner. In the same year, the exhibition travelled to Zurich, Berlin, Danzig and Vienna, and in 1931 it was presented in Tokyo and Osaka. In Japan—where the exhibition was presented in Tokyo and Osaka—interwar modernist "New Photography" is often discussed under the label Shinkō shashin (lit. "New Photography")..
