= Herbert Bayer =

Austrian-American artist, architect, and designer (1900–1985)

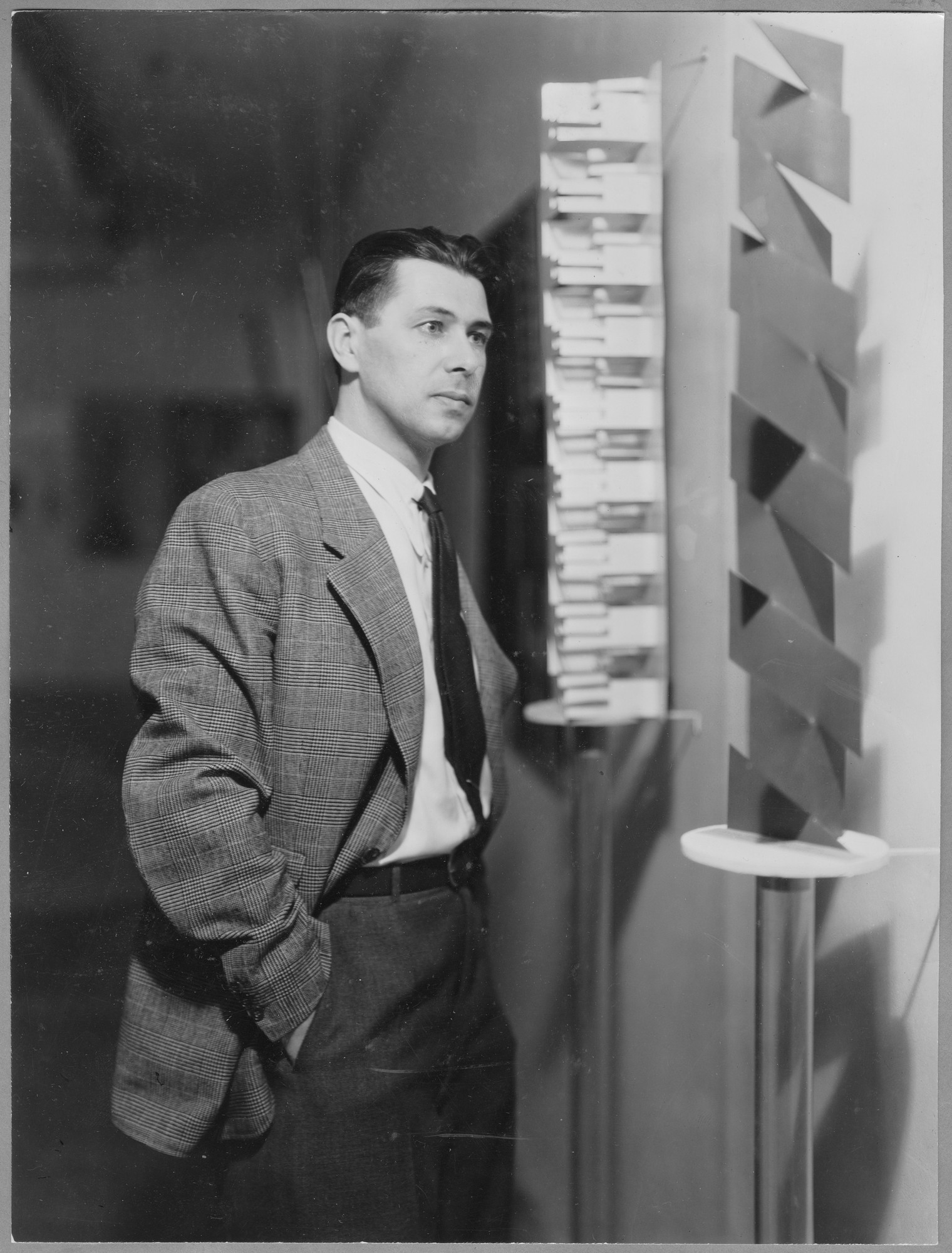
- Bayer at MoMA in 1938 or 1939
- Born: April 5, 1900; Haag, Austria-Hungary
- Died: 30 September 1985 (aged 85); Montecito, California, U.S.
- Education: Weimar Bauhaus
- Known for: Graphic design; typography
- Movement: Modernism
- Spouses: Irene Bayer-Hecht (1925–1944); Joella Synara Haweis (1944–1985)

Herbert Bayer (April 5, 1900 – September 30, 1985) was an Austrian and American graphic designer, painter, photographer, sculptor, art director, environmental and interior designer, and architect. He served as a design consultant to and then Chairman of the Department of Design at the Container Corporation of America. He helped design the campus of The Aspen Institute in Aspen, Colorado, where his earthwork Grass Mound (1955) is located. He was also instrumental in the development of the Atlantic Richfield Company's corporate art collection until his death in 1985.

== Biography ==
=== Training and Bauhaus years ===
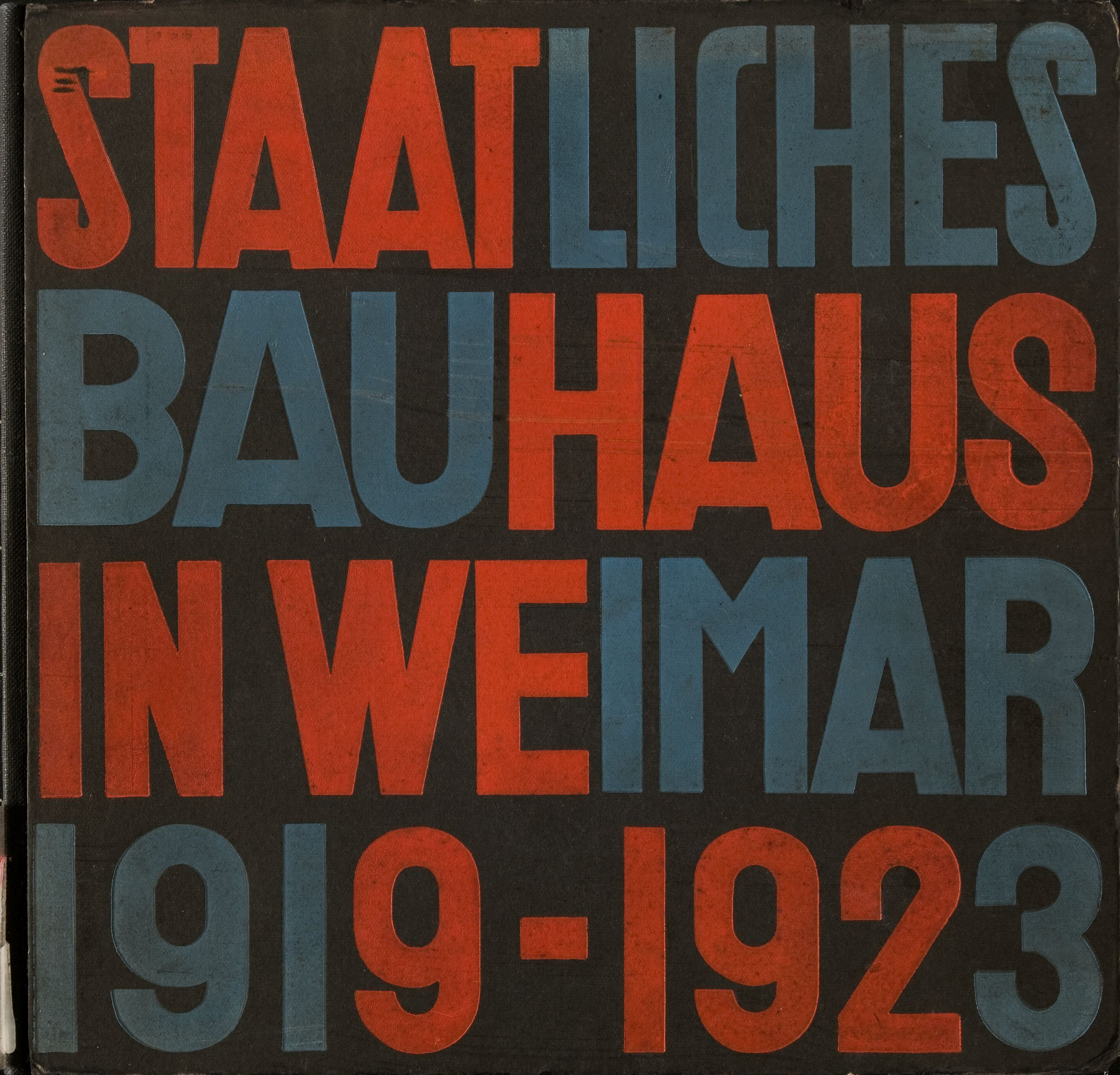
Staatliches Bauhaus in Weimar 1919–1923 (1923)

Bayer apprenticed under the artist Georg Schmidthammer in Linz. Leaving the workshop to study at the Darmstadt Artists' Colony, he became interested in Walter Gropius's Bauhaus manifesto. After Bayer had studied for four years at the Bauhaus under such teachers as Wassily Kandinsky, Paul Klee and László Moholy-Nagy, Gropius appointed Bayer director of printing and advertising.

In the spirit of reductive minimalism, Bayer developed a crisp visual style and adopted use of all-lowercase, sans serif typefaces for most Bauhaus publications. Bayer is one of several typographers of the period including Kurt Schwitters and Jan Tschichold who experimented with the creation of a simplified more phonetic-based alphabet. From 1925 to 1930, Bayer designed a geometric sans-serif titled Proposal for a Universal Typeface (Herbert Bayer, universal) that existed only as a design and was never actually cast into real type. These designs are now issued in digital form as Bayer Universal (P22 Type Foundry Bauhaus Set). The design also inspired ITC Bauhaus and Architype Bayer, which bears comparison with the stylistically related typeface Architype Schwitters. Something important to note about Bayers proposed "Universal Typeface" is that the reason he abandoned uppercase letters when designing this typeface was because he aimed to make the writing process more efficient. While designing his universal typeface, the first sketches revealed that he was focusing on geometric forms.

In 1923 Bayer met the photographer Irene Bayer-Hecht at the first large Bauhaus exhibit in Weimar. They married in 1925, separated in 1928, had a daughter, Julia Alexandra, in 1929, and divorced in 1944.

=== Post-Bauhaus years in Germany ===
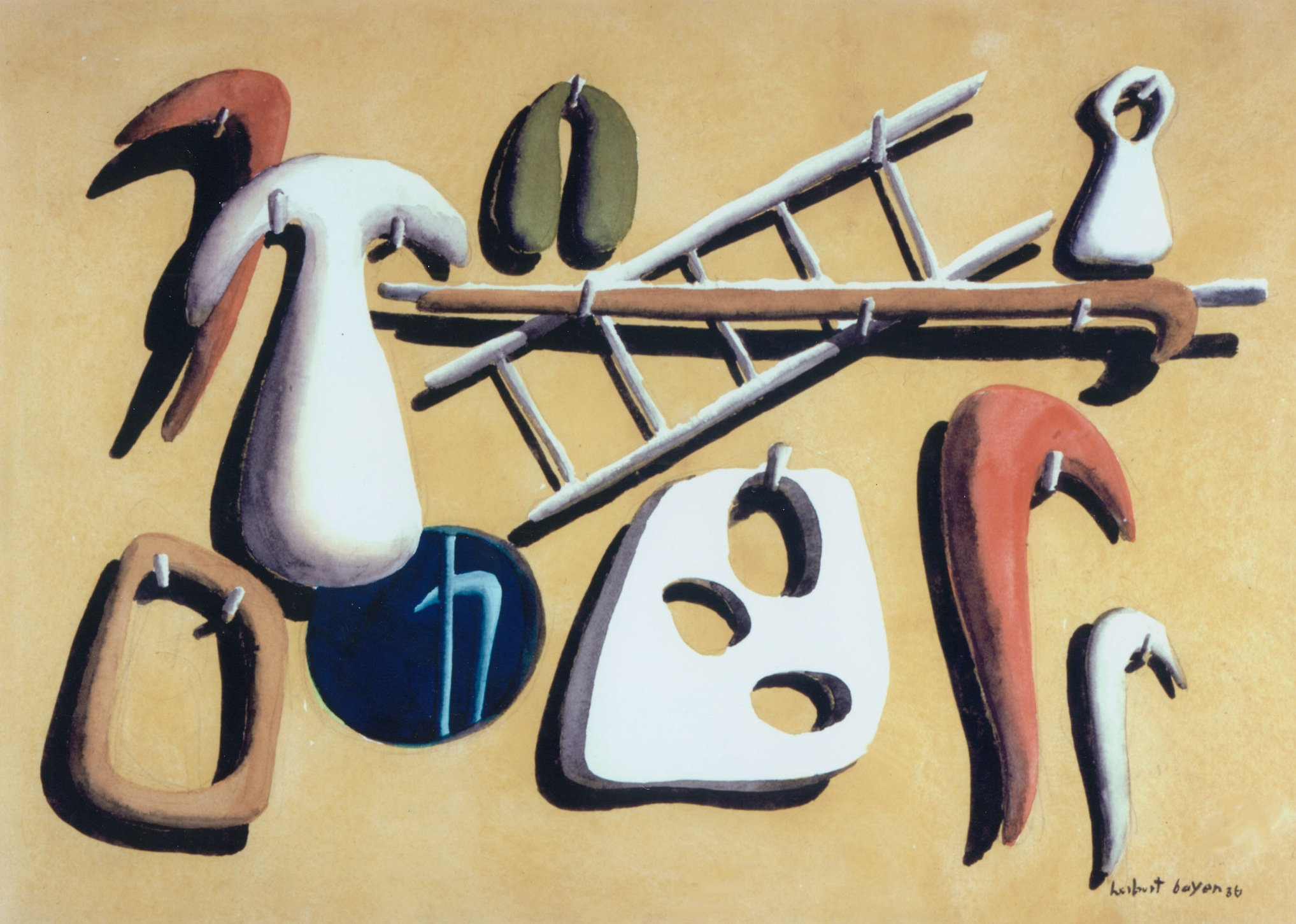
Stadelwand, 1936, M.T. Abraham Foundation

In 1928, Bayer left the Bauhaus to become art director of Vogue magazine's Berlin office. He remained in Germany far later than most other progressives. In 1936 he designed a brochure for the Deutschland Ausstellung, an exhibition for tourists in Berlin during the 1936 Olympic Games – the brochure celebrated life in Nazi Germany, and the authority of Hitler. However, in 1937, works of Bayer's were included in the Nazi propaganda exhibition "Degenerate Art", upon which he left Germany. Upon fleeing Germany, he traveled in Italy.

=== Immigration to the United States ===
In 1938, Bayer came to the United States and remained until his death in 1985. With Walter Gropius, Bayer designed the landmark Bauhaus 1918–1928 exhibition at the Museum of Modern Art in 1938. In 1944, he married Joella Synara Haweis (1907–2004), the daughter of poet and Dada artist Mina Loy. The same year, he became a U.S. citizen.

=== Time in Aspen ===
In 1946, the Bayers relocated from New York to Aspen, Colorado. Hired by businessman and philanthropist Walter Paepcke, Bayer moved to Aspen, Colorado as Paepcke promoted skiing as a popular sport. Bayer's architectural work in the town included co-designing the Aspen Institute and restoring the Wheeler Opera House, but his production of promotional posters identified skiing with wit, excitement, and glamour.

He designed a cover for Japanese graphic design magazine Idea in 1955.

In 1959, he designed his "fonetik alfabet", a phonetic alphabet, for English. It was sans-serif and without capital letters. He had specialized symbols for the endings -ed, -ory, -ing, and -ion, as well as the digraphs "ch", "sh", and "ng". An underline indicated the doubling of a consonant in traditional orthography.

While living in Aspen, Bayer met oilman and ecologist Robert O. Anderson and Bayer designed several buildings for Anderson. The two men maintained a close relationship for decades, and Anderson subsequently began collecting contemporary art. Following Anderson's formation of the Atlantic Richfield Company in 1966, ARCO developed a large corporate art collections, with Bayer serving as the company's Art and Design Consultant.

Overseeing acquisitions for ARCO Plaza, the newly built (1972) twin 51-story office towers in Los Angeles that served as the new company's corporate headquarters, Bayer was also responsible for the ARCO logo and designing all corporate branding related to the company. Prior to the completion of ARCO Plaza, Anderson commissioned Bayer to design a sculpture-fountain, titled Double Ascension, to be installed between the towers.

Under Bayer's direction, ARCO's art collection grew to nearly 30,000 works nationwide, managed by Atlantic Richfield Company Art Collection staff. ARCO's collection was consisted of an extremely wide range of media and styles; ranging from contemporary and earlier paintings, sculpture, works on paper (including drawings, watercolors and signed original lithographs, etchings and serigraphs) and signed photographs to tribal and ethnic art from many cultures, as well as historic prints and artifacts, all displayed throughout ARCO's buildings in Los Angeles and several other cities. Three years after ARCO was taken over by BP in 2000, that company's then-chairman, Lord Brown, personally ordered ARCO's art collection liquidated. It was sold through Christie's and LA Modern Auctions. Bayer made provisions to donate, after his death, a collection of his works which had been housed in ARCO's conference center in Santa Barbara to the Los Angeles County Museum of Art. The works have been loaned previously to the Denver Art Museum. He was elected a Fellow of the American Academy of Arts and Sciences in 1979.

== Legacy and influence ==
Bayer's works appear in prominent public collections, including the Museum of Modern Art, Harvard University Art Museums, Cooper Hewitt, Santa Barbara Museum of Art, MIT List Visual Arts Center, and Tate Modern. The Denver Art Museum holds several thousand of his works, many donated by Joella Bayer after his death.

Many of his outdoor sculptures are extant. Double Ascension occupies what is now City National Plaza in downtown Los Angeles. His Fountain Sculpture sits outside the Kunstmuseum Lentos in Linz, Austria. He designed the Mill Creek Canyon Earthworks, an environmental sculpture and park in Kent, Washington. His Articulated Wall in the Denver Design District was his last completed commission.

In 2019, the philanthropists and entrepreneurs Lynda and Stewart Resnick donated $10 million to the nonprofit Aspen Institute for a center dedicated to Bayer on the Institute's Aspen Meadows campus, in Aspen, Colorado, which Bayer designed. The Resnick Center for Herbert Bayer Studies is an exhibition space and center for the study of art and culture that preserves the art and legacy of Herbert Bayer. The Bayer Center promotes a fuller understanding of Bayer—one of the leading figures to translate the Bauhaus movement into an American context—and his contributions to art, design, and architecture. It anchors the Aspen Institute’s campus-wide visual arts program, which includes over 7,000 square feet of gallery space and multiple site-specific outdoor art installations. The vision is intended to honor Bayer’s interdisciplinary perspective by promoting an understanding of art and design through exhibitions, public programming, and educational initiatives. The Bayer Center is free and open to the public.

Herbert Bayer was the architect for the Modern Art Museum of Fort Worth, in Fort Worth, Texas. The institution moved to its new location designed by architect Tadao Ando in 2002. The building, owned by the City of Fort Worth was, until 2024, home to the Fort Worth Community Arts Center, which featured seven galleries highlighting regional and national artists.

== Typefaces and other work ==
Herbert Bayer's experimental universal typeface combined upper and lowercase characters into a single character set (1925)

- Proposal for a Universal Type (1925–1930), this typeface existed only as designs.
- Bayer Type (Berthold Type Foundry, 1933)
- Works include: German banknotes; die Neue linie magazine; Universal typeface.

== Awards and honors ==
- Culture Prize of the German Society for Photography (Cologne, 1969)
- Inducted into the Hall of Fame by the Art Directors Club (1975)
- Architecture Forum Upper Austria in Linz
- Honorary doctorate from the Technical University of Graz (1977)
- Austrian Cross of Honour for Science and Art (1977)
- Ambassador's Award for Excellence (London)

== See also ==
- List of Austrian artists and architects
