= Söre Popitz =

German graphic designer

Irmgard Sörensen-Popitz
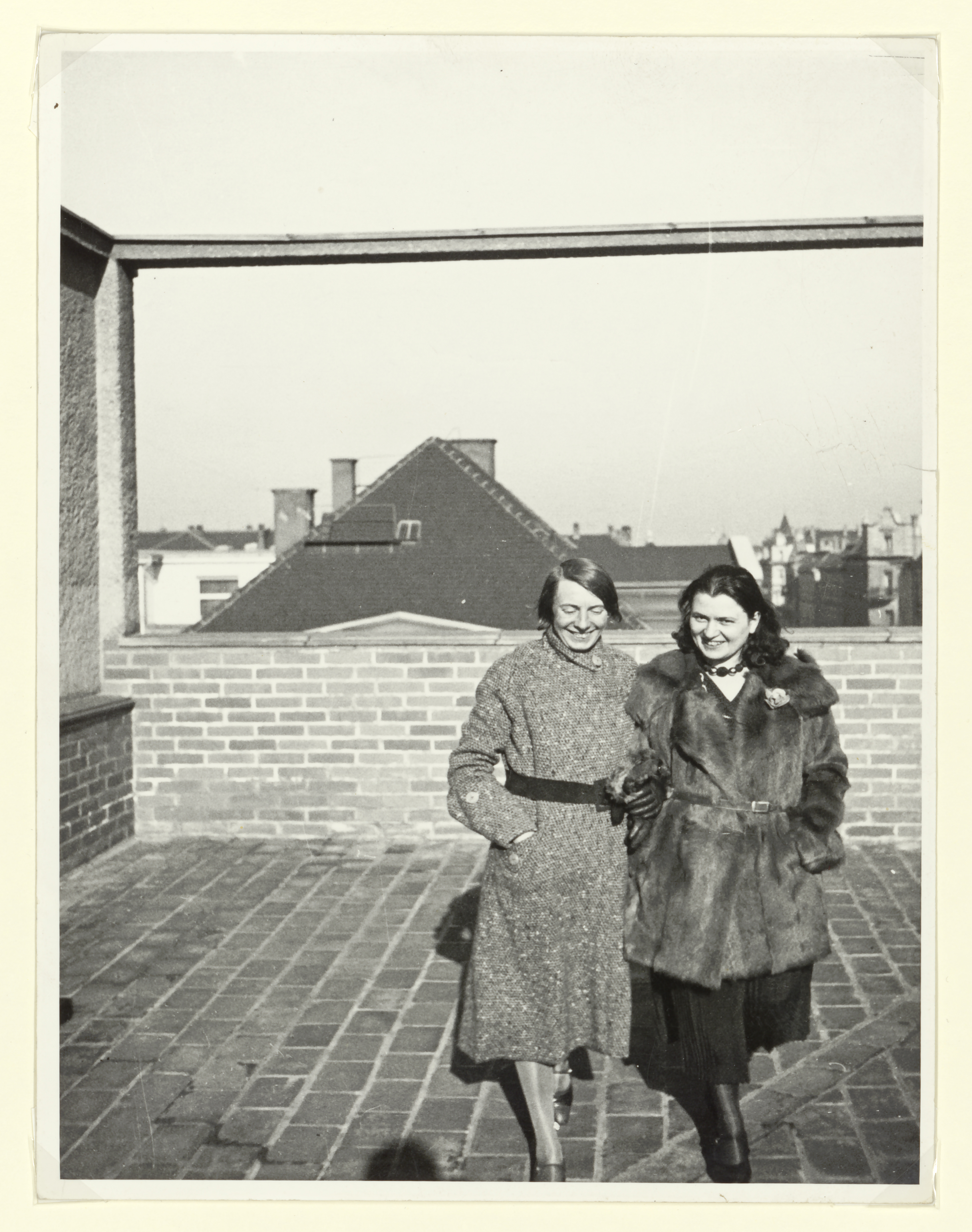
- Söre Popitz (left) with Marianne Brandt (1926)
- Born: 3 June 1896; Kiel
- Died: 2 November 1993 (aged 97)
- Education: Hochschule für Grafik und Buchkunst Leipzig; Bauhaus Weimar
- Occupation: Graphic designer
- Spouse: Friedrich Popitz

Irmgard Sörensen-Popitz (3 June 1896 – 2 November 1993) frequently known as Söre Popitz was a German graphic designer who studied at the Bauhaus.

== Life ==
Irmgard Sörensen was born on 3 July 1896 in Kiel, Germany.

She began painting at an early age, encouraged by her grandmother. In her teenage years, Sörensen continued to pursue visual arts, going on to attend the craft college in Kiel. In 1917 she matriculated at the Hochschule für Grafik und Buchkunst Leipzig, where she studied graphic arts, drafting, and advertising. After receiving her diploma in 1924, Sörensen married Friedrich Popitz, a physician.

In October 1924, Sörensen-Popitz enrolled in the Bauhaus Weimar. In her first semester, Söre Popitz attended a first year course covering design foundations taught by Moholy-Nagy, Wassily Kandinsky, and Josef Albers. Her other mentors at the school included Jan Tschichold and Paul Klee. After just a semester at the school, Söre Popitz left the Bauhaus, entering the workforce as a designer in Leipzig instead.

Her early departure from the Bauhaus is sometimes cited as a reason she emerged as a graphic designer while other female students did not; while the Bauhaus Weimar had begun to accept female designers, women were frequently encouraged to go into weaving and textile design as opposed to the male dominated fields of architecture and graphic arts.

From her departure from the Bauhaus until after the war, Söre Popitz was frequently employed by Otto Beyer, a publishing house in Leipzig. The majority of Söre Popitz's Bauhaus-era work and work produced for Otto Beyer were destroyed in the bombing of Leipzig during World War II.

Söre Popitz and her husband moved to Frankfurt following the Soviet occupation of East Germany. Friedrich died in 1949, just a few months after the couple's relocation.

In mid 1950s, Popitz returned to painting, abandoning the Constructivism that had characterized her pre-war designs for Informalism.

Irmgard Sörensen-Popitz died in 1993, at the age of 97.

== Artwork ==
Most of Popitz's early work falls under the style of Constructivism. Many of her earlier graphic design works feature heavy emphasis on geometry, while also straying away from bright and pigmented colors. In 1920, her poster Poster for Advertising Art Exhibition in Leipzig won a competition, providing a pivotal moment in her career.

After her time out the Bauhaus, Popitz continues her constructivist style throughout her work. When hired to work for the magazine Die Neue Linie (The New Line), much of her work can be connected to her works from her Bauhaus era. Many of her magazine covers and article designs often feature the figure in some way, mainly the female figure, while also combining color with black and white photographs. These elements working together create a formal, clean look, while also staying somewhat casual.

Unfortunately, many of Popitz's earlier works were lost during the Bombing of Leipzig. However, despite these setbacks, Popitz is still considered one of the most important women in graphic design, especially during World War I and World War II.

After the death of her husband in 1949, Popitz begins to design book covers for Insel-Bücherei, a book series that began in 1912. By 1956, Popitz returned to painting, becoming heavily influenced by Informel Style. Her paintings soon took on a more abstract, flowy style, focusing heavily on loose gestures and casual strokes. She continued this painting style until her death in 1993. Much of her work was inherited by Wilma Stöhr, a gallery worker from Wuppertal, Germany.

== See also ==
- Ivana Tomljenović-Meller
