= Zmajevac =

Zmajevac Vörösmart (Hungarian)
- Village (Selo)
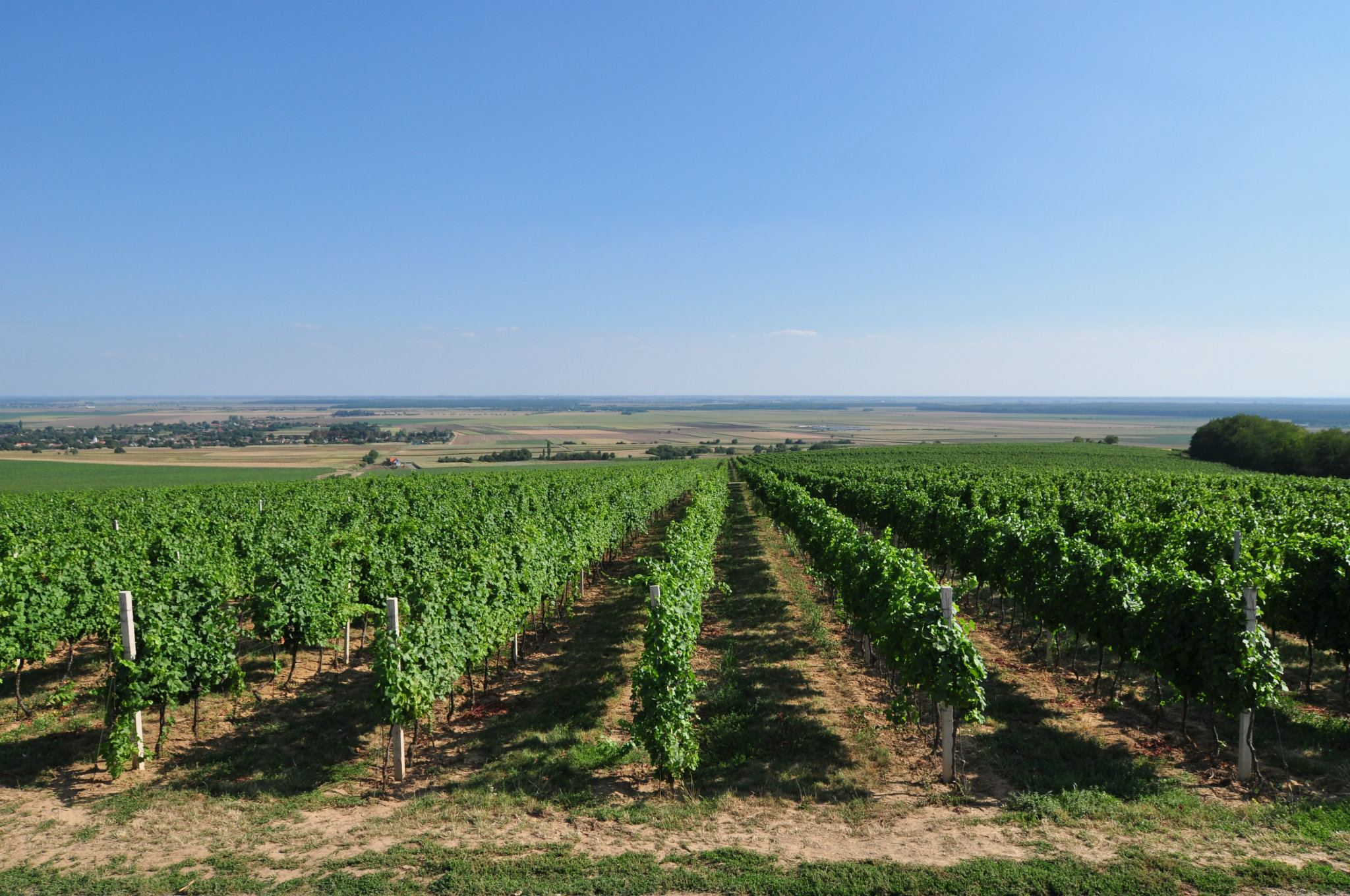
- Wine route

- Location within Croatia
- Country: Croatia
- Region: Baranya (Podunavlje)
- County: Osijek-Baranja
- Municipality: Kneževi Vinogradi

Area
  - Total: 53.4 km^{2} (20.6 sq mi)

Population (2021)
  - Total: 544
  - Density: 10.2/km^{2} (26.4/sq mi)

Zmajevac (Hungarian: Vörösmart; Serbian Cyrillic: Змајевац; Latin: Ad Novas) is a settlement in the region of Baranja, Croatia. Administratively, it is located in the Kneževi Vinogradi municipality within the Osijek-Baranja County. The population is 974 people. Zmajevac was founded on the foundations of the Roman colony Ad Novas. In 1246, it is mentioned under the name Verusmorth.

== Geography ==
Zmajevac is approximately 36 km north of Osijek and 22 km south of the border with Hungary. Serbia is approximately 8 kilometers away.

== Ethnic groups (2001 census) ==
- 701 - Hungarians
- 178 - Croats
- 10 - Serbs
- 85 - others

== Notable people ==
- Otti Berger (1898–1944) – textile artist and weaver
