= Double Ascension =

Public sculpture

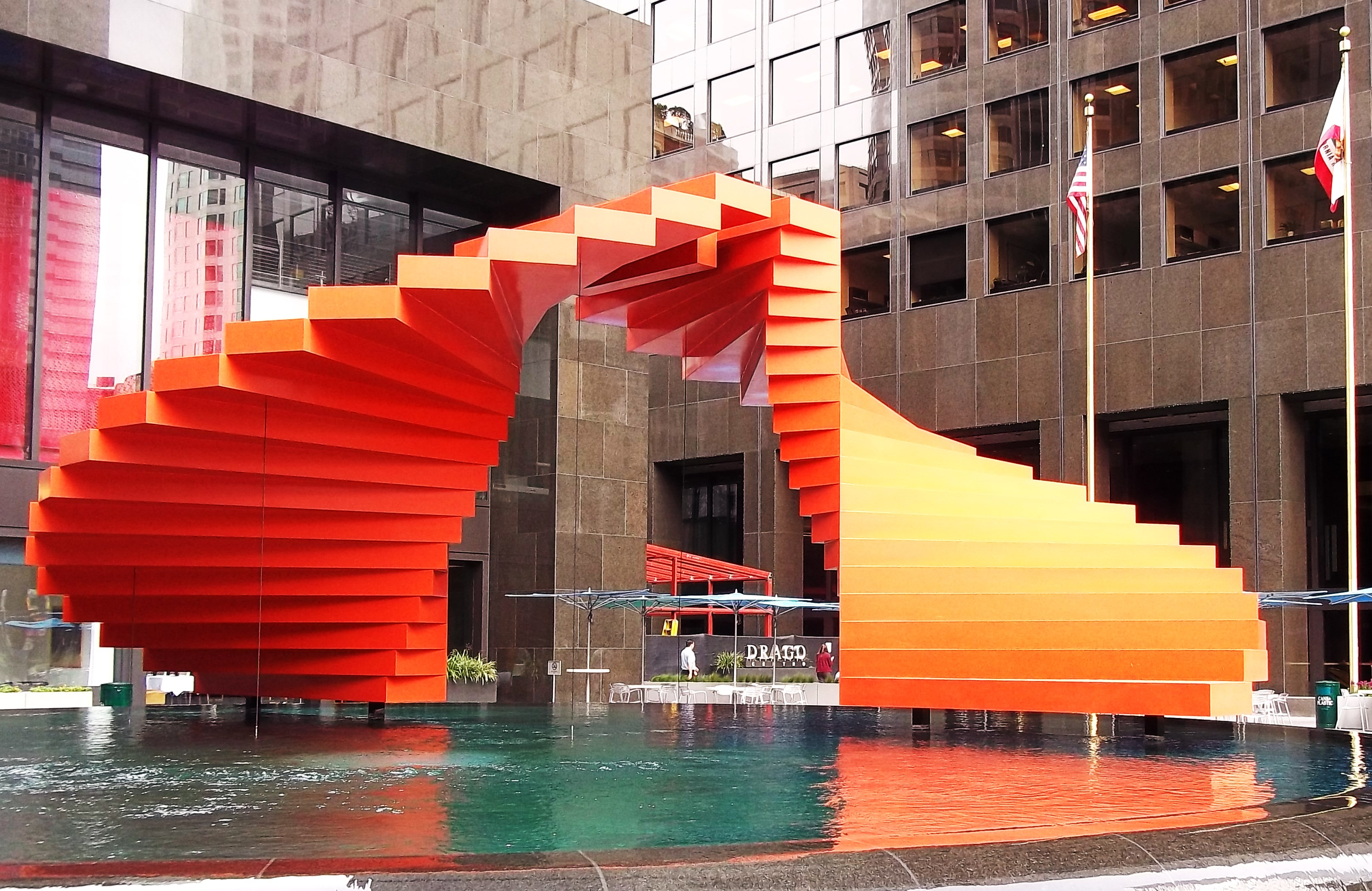
- Artist: Herbert Bayer
- Year: 1969
- Dimensions: 7.3 m (24 ft); 12 m diameter (40 ft)
- Location: City National Plaza; Los Angeles; 34.051086°N 118.257132°W
- Owner: CalPERS; CommonWealth Pacific Capital

Double Ascension is a public art installation by Herbert Bayer consisting of an abstract sculpture and fountain. Measuring 14.5-by-33-foot (4.4 by 10.1 m) long, with individual steps measuring 35 in (89 cm) by 11 ft (3.4 m) by 9 in (23 cm), the sculpture is fabricated in painted steel and mounted within a 60-foot (18 m) diameter pool. It is located in City National Plaza at 515 South Flower Street, Bunker Hill, Los Angeles, California, United States.

== History ==
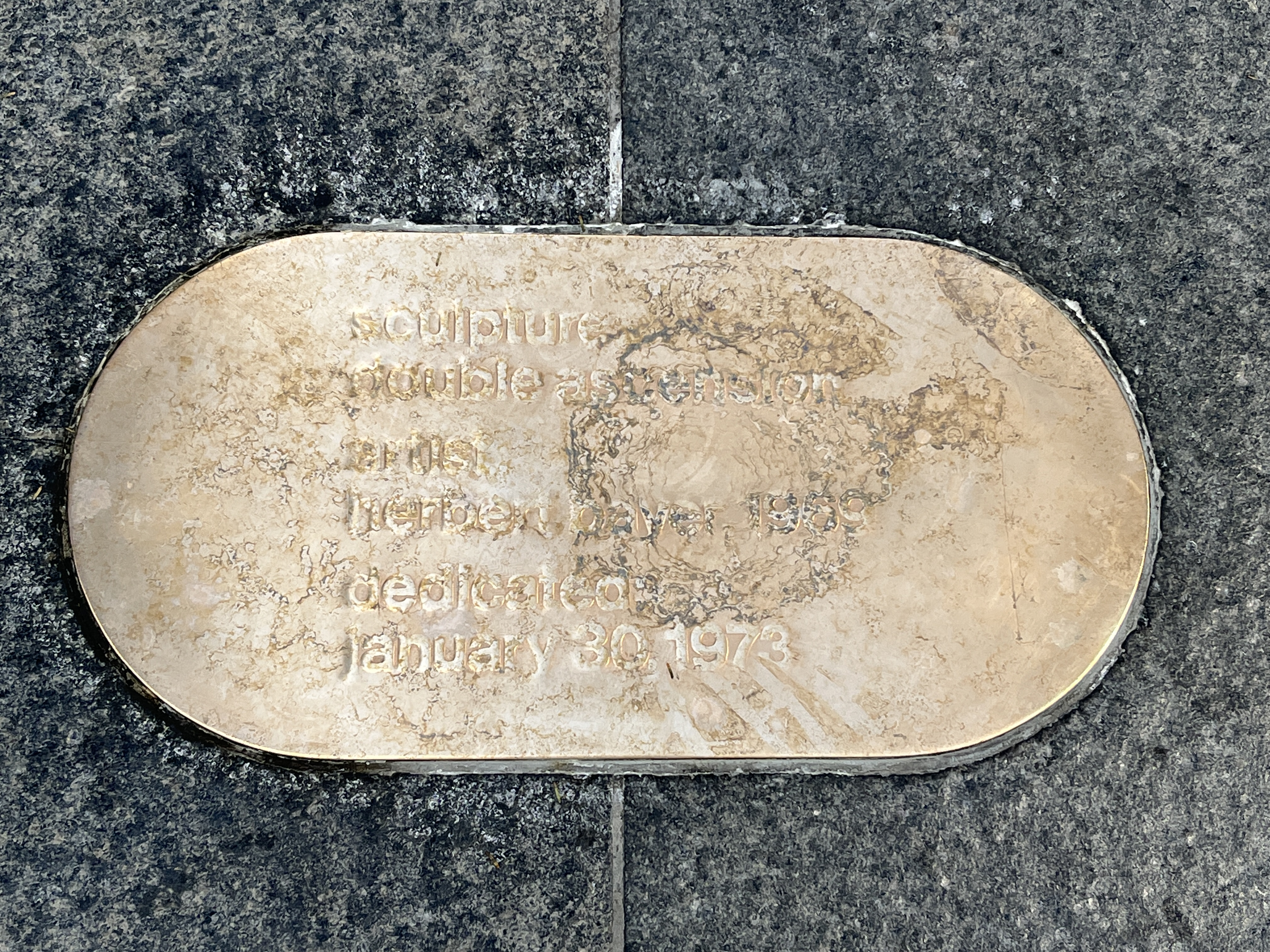
Plaque

The sculpture was dedicated on January 20, 1973. Bayer was commissioned by ARCO, and he based his design on his earlier works Articulated Wall, Double Twist, and Stairs to Nowhere. An unverified claim is that Bayer's original title for the sculpture was Stairway to Nowhere, which he changed at the request of company officials.
