= City National Plaza =

Skyscraper in Los Angeles

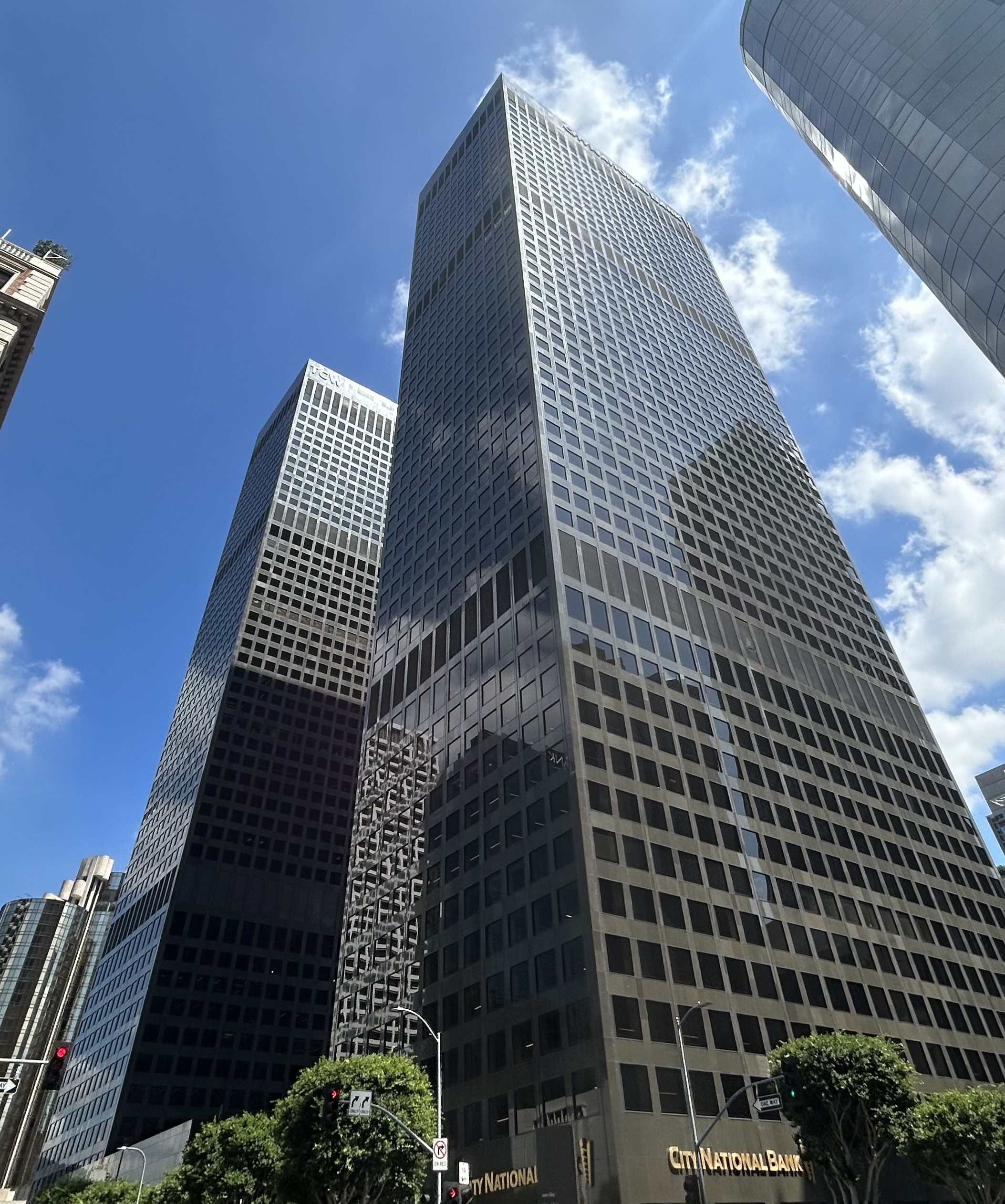
- City National Plaza in September of 2025

- Location within the Los Angeles metropolitan area Location within California Location within the United States
- Former names: ARCO Plaza (1972–2005); ARCO Center; ARCO Plaza North Tower; ARCO Plaza South Tower; Atlantic Richfield Towers; Bank of America Tower
- Alternative names: Los Angeles Twin Towers

General information
- Type: Commercial offices
- Location: Bunker Hill, Downtown LA, 505-555 South Flower Street, Los Angeles, United States
- Coordinates: 34.0508°N 118.2569°W
- Construction started: 1969
- Completed: 1972
- Owner: CalPERS; CommonWealth Partners
- Operator: CommonWealth Partners

Height
- Roof: 213.3 m (700 ft)

Technical details
- Floor count: 52
- Floor area: 206,000 m^{2} (2.22 million sq ft)
- Lifts/elevators: 64

Design and construction
- Architect: Albert C. Martin & Associates
- Main contractor: Robert E. McKee, Inc.

Other information
- Public transit: Grand Avenue Arts/Bunker Hill

Website
- www.citynationalplaza.com

City National Plaza is a twin tower skyscraper complex on South Flower Street in western Downtown Los Angeles, California, United States. It was originally named ARCO Plaza upon opening in 1972.

== History ==
=== Richfield Tower ===
The present complex is on the site of the landmark Richfield Tower, that was designed in the Art Deco style by Morgan, Walls & Clements, and completed in 1929. It was the headquarters of the Atlantic Richfield oil company. It was demolished in the spring of 1969.

=== ARCO Plaza ===
The current skyscraper complex was built as the ARCO Plaza, with a pair of 213.3 m (700 ft) 52-story office towers. The northernmost tower became the new world headquarters for the Atlantic Richfield Company (ARCO), the present day TCW Tower. The southern tower became the Los Angeles headquarters of the Bank of America. There was a 2-floor underground shopping complex, which could be accessed by the buildings' elevators and escalators.

Upon completion in 1972, the ARCO Plaza towers were the tallest buildings in the city for one year before being overtaken by Aon Center, and were the tallest twin towers in the world until the completion of the World Trade Center in New York City. The towers are the tallest twin buildings in the United States outside of New York City, where the 55-floor Deutsche Bank Center stands at 750 ft (230 m).

In 1986, joint owners ARCO and Bank of America sold the buildings to Shuwa Investments Corp., the American subsidiary of Shuwa Co. of Tokyo, for $650 million while both remained tenants in their respective named towers. Shuwa later sold the property in 2003 to Thomas Properties Group and other investors for $270 million.

The towers are constructed of steel frames covered with polished panels of forest green granite and panes of bronze glass. In 2016, the exterior of the top two floors and the service roof of The Paul Hastings Tower were modified on the north, east, and south flanks to house their upgraded headquarters and offices. This modification features silver trim and panes of light green glass panels.

=== City National Plaza ===
The ARCO Plaza complex was renamed City National Plaza in 2005, and the south and north towers, respectively, were renamed City National Tower and Paul Hastings Tower. The low-rise building at the back of the plaza is known as the Jewel Box, and is occupied by the Gensler architectural firm. Gensler moved from Santa Monica to the Jewel Box in 2011.

The plaza includes a monumental sculpture-fountain, Double Ascension, by artist Herbert Bayer.

== Tenants ==
=== Jewel Box ===
- Gensler—architecture firm.

=== Paul Hastings Tower ===
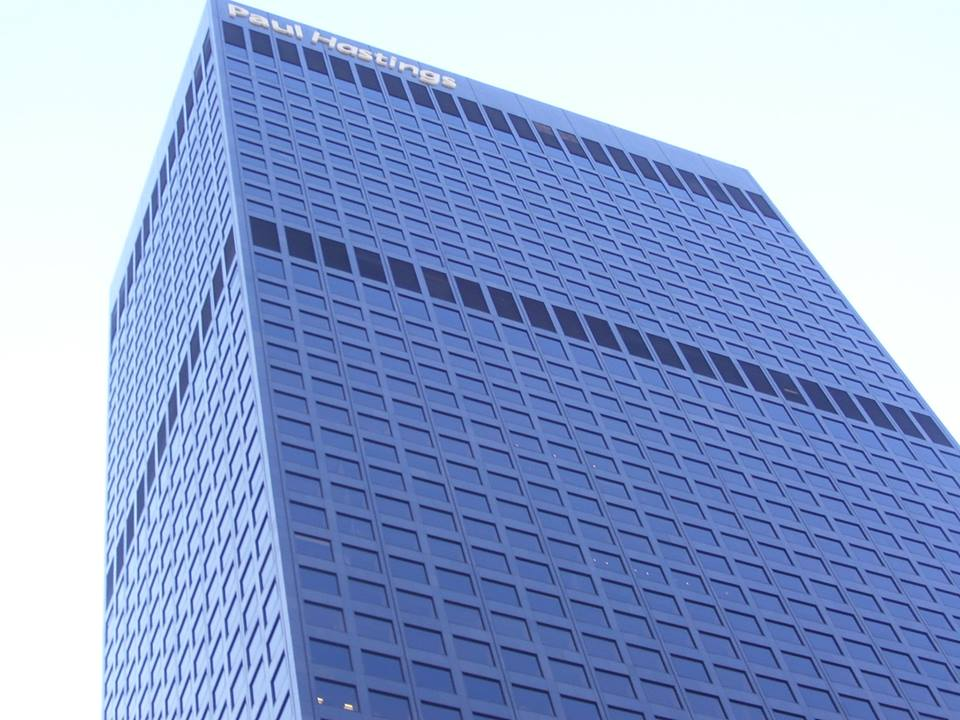
Photograph of the Paul Hastings Tower from ground level in October 2013

- Boston Consulting Group
- Crowell & Moring
- BDO USA, P.C.
- RSM US
- Northwestern Mutual - Los Angeles
- Paul Hastings
- Regus

=== City National Bank Tower ===
- City National Bank
- Foley & Lardner
- Norton Rose Fulbright
- Jones Day
- Katten Muchin Rosenman
- Kroll
- Rottet Studio
- Squire Patton Boggs
- Turner Construction
- White & Case LLP

== Shopping center ==
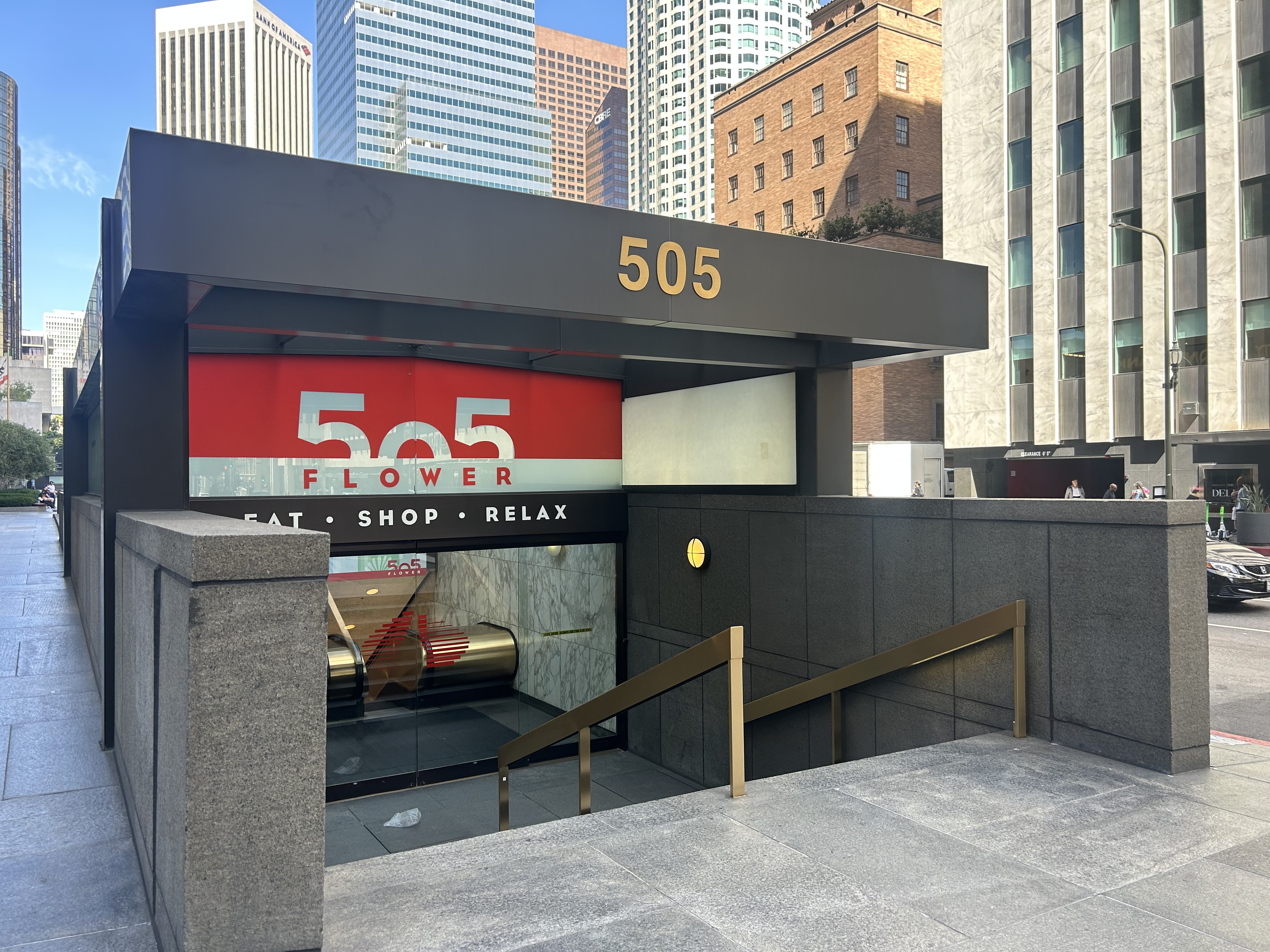
View of the entrance to the 505 Flower Plaza

ARCO Plaza opened with a 220,000 sq ft (20,000 m^{2}) 2-floor underground shopping center, which gained attention for the novelty of a shopping center within an office tower complex and for its sleek design of brick walkways, tiled and mirrored escalator wells and fresh flowers. There were over 40 shops and services and over 10 restaurants including “François”. During the 2004 renovation, the lower shopping level was converted to parking and today the one remaining level is a food court.

== In popular culture ==
- Featured extensively throughout the 1971 movie The Omega Man (which was filmed during the Plaza's construction phase), shown in various stages of completion.
- Plaza area and water sculpture featured in the 1976 film, Marathon Man.
- The complex was also extensively featured in the 1976 NBC mini-series, The Moneychangers, which starred Kirk Douglas, Christopher Plummer, Susan Flannery, Anne Baxter and Timothy Bottoms. The Bank of America branch then located in the jewel Box was rebadged as the First Mercantile American Bank (FMA) main branch for both exterior and interior filming. Multiple exterior shots of the ARCO tower (now the Paul Hastings Tower) were used to suggest it as the location of FMA's executive offices.
- Both towers were prominently featured in a couple of shots from the 1982 film Koyaanisqatsi
- The north "Paul Hastings" tower was depicted as being struck by an air-to-air Sidewinder missile (a shot which utilized a detailed miniature of both towers), in the 1983 film, Blue Thunder.
- In the 2015 film San Andreas, the twin towers were shown swaying violently during an earthquake and in a later shot, the Paul Hastings tower was shown falling on the City National Tower. Later in the film, one of the buildings was reused in the 9.6 earthquake in San Francisco, and renamed as the “San Francisco Bank & Trust.” It is seen breaking in half during the panning shot towards the San Francisco-Oakland Bay Bridge.
- Featured in "Adam-12 Skywatch part 1". Reed and Malloy locate robbery suspects on the 26th floor while cross training with the helicopter unit.

== Gallery ==
City National Plaza Twin Towers
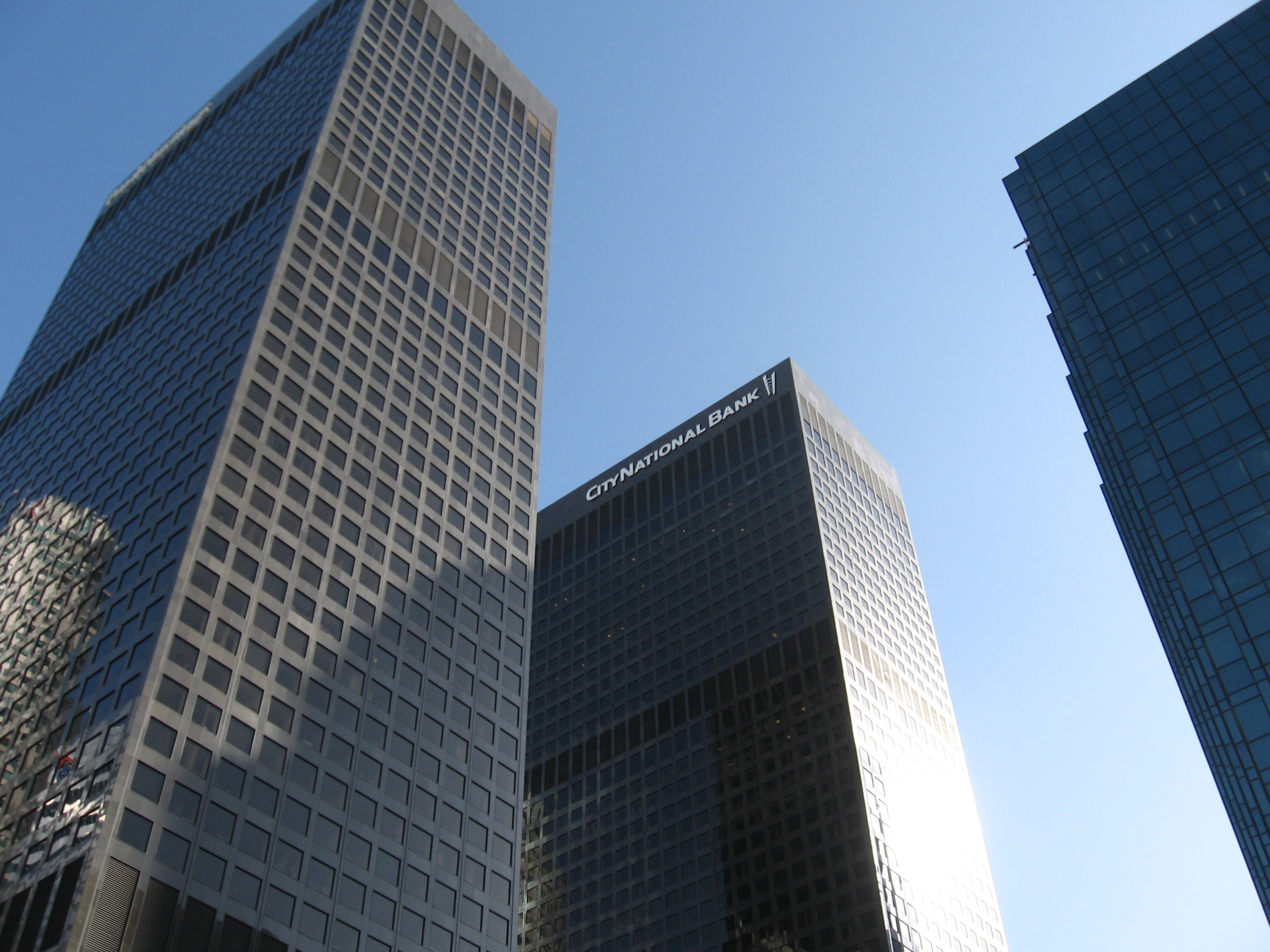

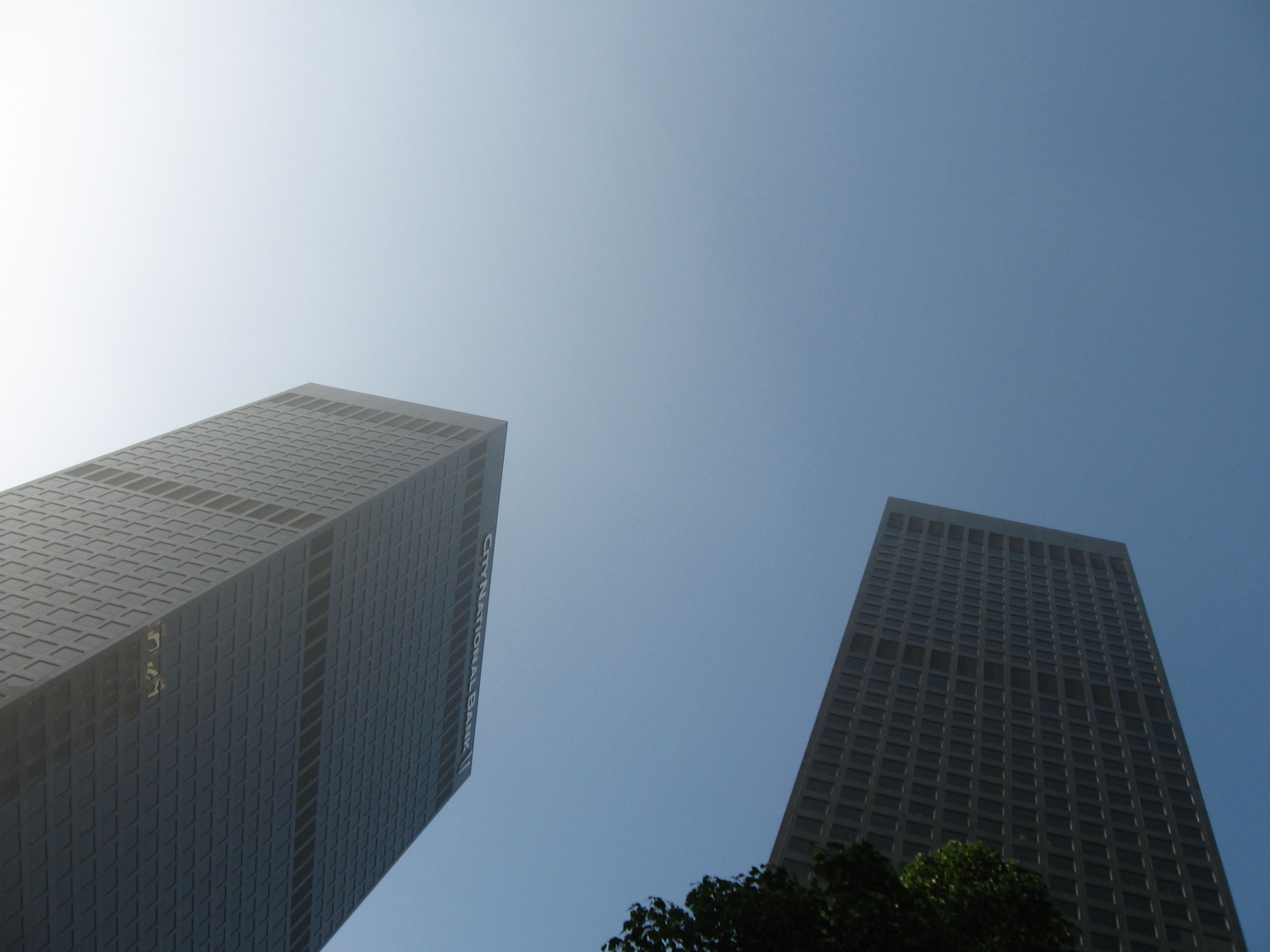

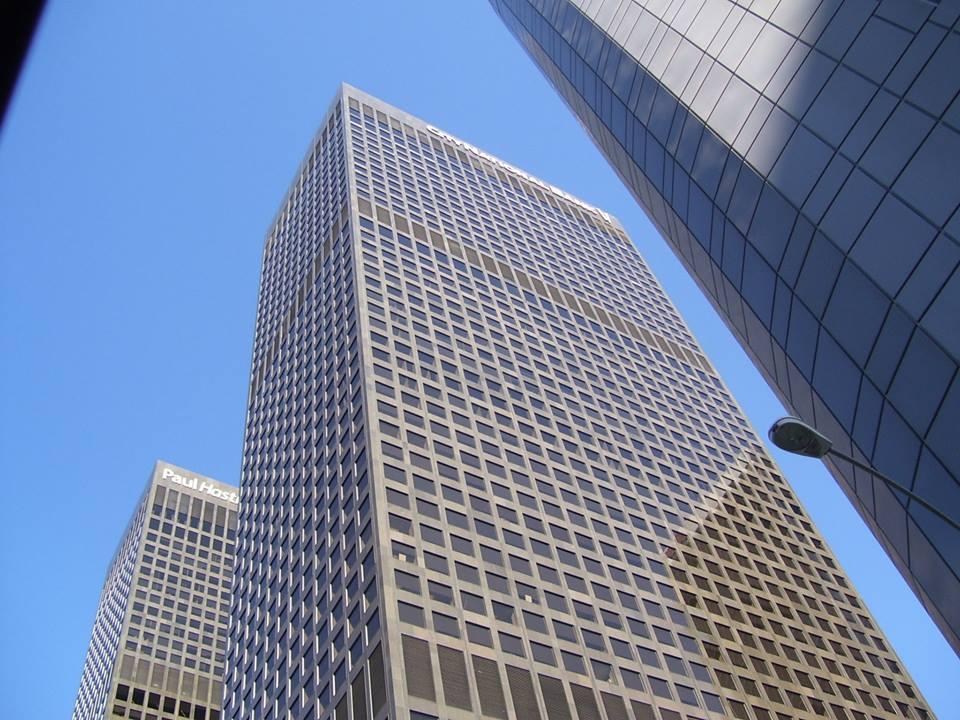

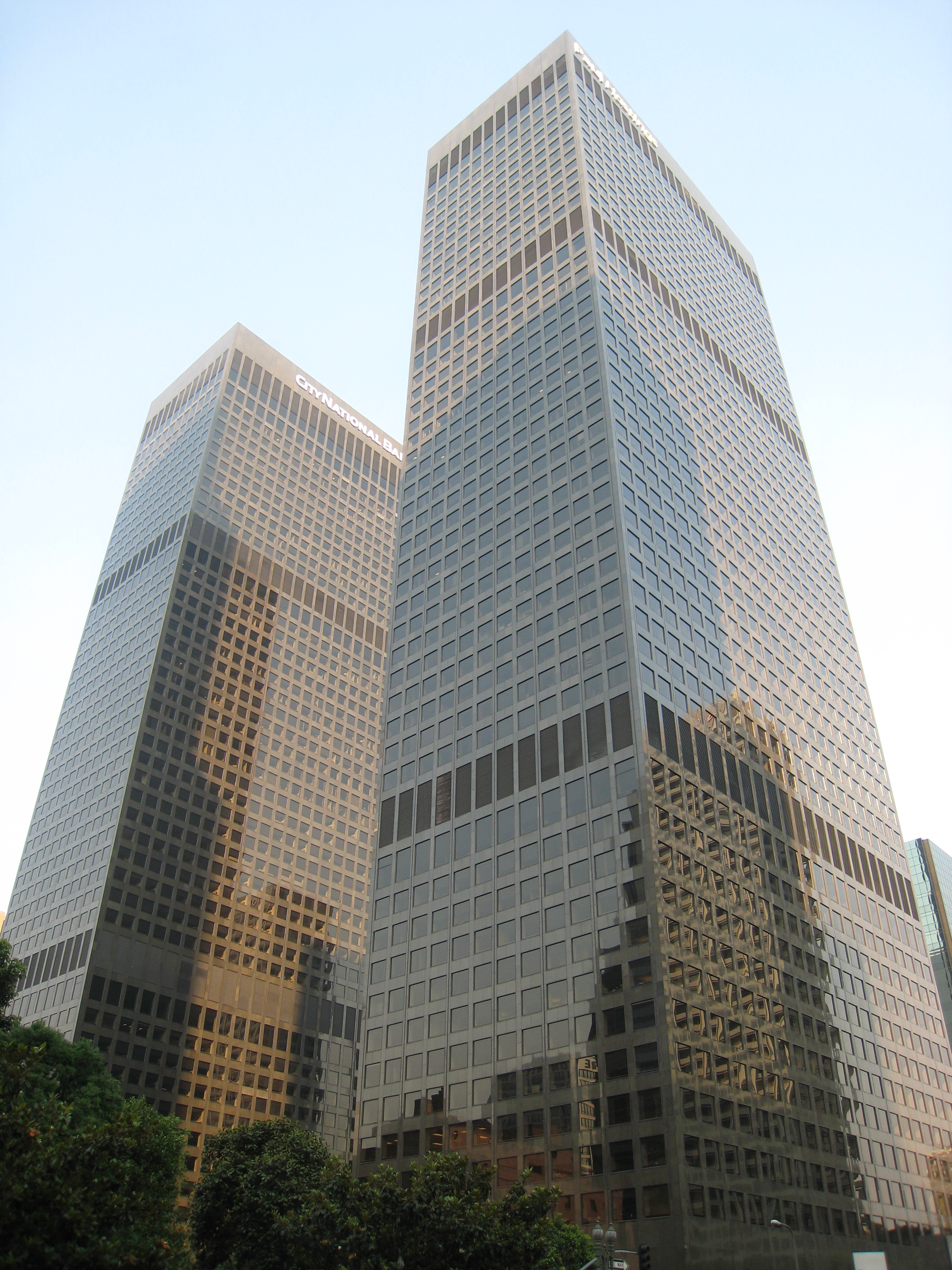

== See also ==
- Richfield Tower
- List of tallest buildings in Los Angeles
