= Walter Peterhans =

German photographer

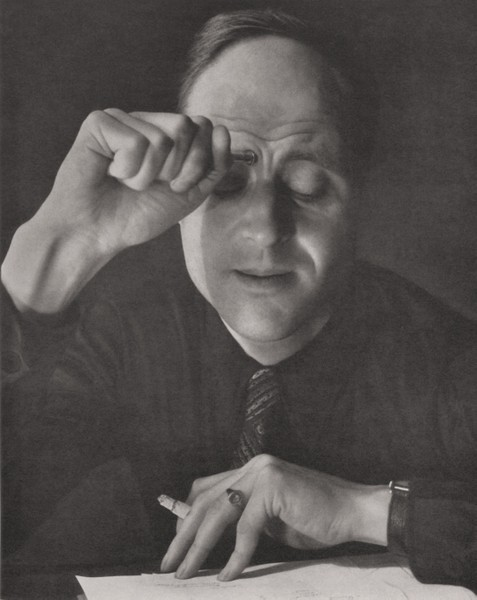
- Peterhans c.1936
- Born: 12 June 1897; Frankfurt am Main
- Died: 12 April 1960 (aged 62); Stetten im Remstal
- Education: TU Dresden; Technische Hochschule München; University of Göttingen; Academy of Visual Arts, Leipzig
- Occupations: Photographer; academic
- Organizations: Bauhaus; Reimann School, Berlin; Illinois Institute of Technology; Ulm School of Design
- Style: Neues Sehen
- Spouses: Gertrude Lempp Kerbis; Brigitte Schlaich (m.1957)

Walter Peterhans (12 June 1897 – 12 April 1960) was a German photographer best known as a teacher and course leader of photography at the Bauhaus from 1929 until 1933, and at the Reimann School in Berlin under Hugo Häring.

In the 1930s, Peterhans was a proponent of the Neues Sehen (New Vision) movement, taking close-up, still-life photographs of everyday objects and images that played with unusual angles and lighting. At the Bauhaus, Peterhans's teaching involved using the theories of Kant, Plato and Pythagoras to explain how beauty is constructed in the mind and how it can be created in works of art. His students there included Ellen Auerbach, Hannes Neuner, Naftali Avnon, Ivana Tomljenović-Meller, Ricarda Schwerin, Grete Stern and Elsa Thiemann.

Peterhans immigrated to Chicago in 1938 to teach the 'visual training' course to architecture students at Illinois Institute of Technology under the direction of Mies van der Rohe. The course consisted of ten units to be completed over four semesters. The course was so successful that it continued for over thirty years after Peterhans's death.

In 1953, Peterhans was part of the founding core faculty at the Ulm School of Design (Hochschule für Gestaltung, 1953–1968) in Germany.

In the United States he was briefly married to American architect Gertrude Lempp Kerbis before he married Brigitte Schlaich, also an architect, in 1957. He died of an unexpected heart attack at the house of his in-laws in Stetten im Remstal, near Stuttgart, and is buried there.

The Museum Folkwang in Essen holds the copyright to Peterhans's work.
