= Naftali Avnon =

Jewish-Russian photographer, cameraman and graphic artist (1910–1977)

Naftali Avnon (Hebrew: אבנון נפתל, romanized: Avnon Naftal, also Naftali Rubinstein) (born 10 April 1910 in Pinsk, Russian Empire; died 22 June 1977 in Tel Aviv), was a Jewish Russian Bauhaus student, photographer, photojournalist, cameraman, author und graphic designer. He was also co-founder of the Israeli Film Association Igud Anaf Hakolnoa.

== Life ==
Naftali Avnon was born on April 10, 1910, in Pinsk, into a wealthy Zionist family.

=== Training at the Bauhaus Dessau ===
Naftali Avnon attended high school in Warsaw until the 10th grade and joined the international socialist-Zionist youth organization Hashomer Hatzair at a young age. In 1928, at the age of 18, Avnon moved to Dessau and, after completing his preliminary studies, began studying printing/advertising at the Bauhaus School there. His teachers included the painter and art theorist Josef Albers, the painter and typographer Joost Schmidt, and Joost Schmidt, with whom he studied photography.

Most interesting in this regard are rehearsal photographs taken of the Women's Dance by a Bauhaus student, Naftali Avnon (1910–1977). These give an idea of the eerie, somewhat stilted movement the doll-like "women" (actually men) made in their extravagant masks and costumes, which look like Oriental parodies of nineteenth-century fashions. Even more interesting, the snapshots reveal the power of the dancers to make the photographer move, to make him get closer to and farther from the strange creatures, look at them from odd angles or in different configurations of light. However, Schlemmer did not want the pictures published because they did not give an adequate sense of the space in which the dancers appeared and because they looked spontaneous or amateurish, not like genuine artworks. He preferred the posed photographs of the piece taken by Umbo (Otto Umbehr), which, although quite interesting in themselves, do not convey the idea of a dance (Faber, Tanzfoto, 79–83).

— Faber, The Bauhaus Experiments,

In the photography course, he befriended his Yugoslavian fellow student and staunch communist Ivana Tomljenović-Meller, who later became a photographer, graphic designer, and art teacher. Ivana Tomljenović-Meller had joined the KPD Communist Party of Germany) and was part of the Communist Student Group at the Bauhaus.

In 1929, Naftali Avnon took part in the Film und Foto (FiFo) exhibition in Stuttgart, organized by the Deutscher Werkbund, and moved to Paris after completing his studies at the Bauhaus.

=== Time in Warsaw ===
Around 1934, Avnon returned to Warsaw and opened a graphic design and photography studio, whose clients included book publishers, the ministry, and private companies. Here he joined the circle of sympathizers of the ideals of the Russian Revolution of the “Progressive International.

=== Trip to Palestine ===
In 1936, he traveled to Palestine for the first time, following his parents who had emigrated there. In 1937, he returned to the World's Fair in Paris, where he also became involved with the cultural bohemian scene and worked on experimental cinema for the first time.

== During World War II ==
From 1936 to 1942, he worked as a photojournalist and took photographs for the fundraising organization Keren Hayesodand the environmental organization JNF. In 1938, he returned to Tel Aviv for good. As in Warsaw and Paris, Naftali Avnon established contacts with young Israeli artists and intellectuals in Tel Aviv, including Nissim Aloni, Uri Zohar, Amir Gilboa, Natan Zach, Heda Bushes, Shabtai Tevet, Rachel Eitan, and Mimi Brafman. Naftali Avnon joined the film department of the Jewish Labor Union, which was headed by Swiss cameraman and film director Helmar Lerski. When World War II broke out, he volunteered for the British Army and served in the cartography and photography unit from 1941 to 1945. Later, he served in the map and photo service unit of the Zionist paramilitary underground organization in Palestine, the Hagana, which also included German-born photographer Margot Meier-Sadeh (1910–1951), photojournalist Boris Carmi (1914–2002), and his son Rotenberg.

== Israeli Defense Forces Film Unit 1948 ==
Since the Israeli armed forces needed topographical maps to support them in the Palestinian War (1947–1949), they created the Maps and Photographs Department (MASRIT) and established a film sub-unit in mid-1948. Under the leadership of Naftali Rubinstein, this project was a success. At that time, he changed his name to Naf (Naftali) Avnon

Avnon’s deep knowledge of photography, filmmaking, and skilled camerawork, gained through his extensive pre-war training and experience, distinguished him and the output of his unit. Unlike its peers in other branches of the Israeli military, who tended to point the camera and just record whatever happened, as uncut footage from the IDF Spokesman Office reveals, from its very beginning the IDF Film Unit prized the ability to create a narrative when shooting footage and was cognizant of camera angles, subject placement, and lighting.22 Sound was not shot in the field until much later, but in this early period, it was added in post-production along with musical tracks, sound effects, and audio commentary. One of Avnon’s first hires with experience in filmmaking, Alfred “Freddy” Steinhardt (1923-2012) would later say that the unit began with several people who knew nothing about film but were trying to avoid the front.

— Rachel S. Harris, From Battlefield to Big Screen: Tracing the Origins of Israeli Cinema Through the Archives of the IDF Film Unit,

== After the Palestinian War ==
After the war, one of the unit's special tasks was to produce educational and informational films that were presented to the public. These films were usually commissioned by government agencies and offered the greatest opportunities for creativity and narrative development. This military unit, as well as its leader Naftali Avnon and his colleagues, were respected and recognized for their contribution to filmmaking and their attempt to establish a national film industry in Israel. In 1948, Avnon joined the Israel Defense Forces (IDF) and founded the Teaching Films Unit. From 1950 onwards, he gave up professional photography, worked as a freelance graphic designer, and served as a professional consultant for design and photography at the Israeli pavilion at international trade fairs. In 1952, Avnon and Steinhardt, together with a group of cameramen and film technicians, were among the founders of the Israeli Film Association Igud Anaf Hakolnoa.

Naftali Avnon died on June 22, 1977, in Tel Aviv and was buried in the kibbutz Mishmar HaEmek. Most of his books on graphic design, photography, and art were donated by his heirs to the Bezalel Academy of Art in Jerusalem.

== Memberships ==
1939 to 1941 The Association of Professional Photographers in the Land of Israel (Palestine Professional Photographers Association (PPPA)) (התאחדות הצלמים המקצועיים בארץ-ישראל)

== Filmography ==
- 1946 to 1950 Balaam's Story, Camera, Still photos
- 1950 Mi Klalah L'Brahah, Camera, Camera assistant
- 1947/48 Adamah, Camera
- 1940/41 Kupat Cholim, Production manager
- 1941 Labour Palestine, Production manager
- 1940 Amal, Production manager
- 1939/40 Yaldei Haschemesch, production manager"Naftali Rubinstein" (in German). filmportal.de.

== Own works ==
- So eat, my darling A guide to the yiddish kitchen von Uri Sella und Naf Avnon New York: F. Fell Publishers 1977
- Porträts und Porträts "דיוקן ודיוקנאות" – Naf Avnon, Tzur & Tzur Publishing, Aviraz Press, 1980

== Literature ==
- In memory of Nafti Avnon – Commander of the Film Uni (לזכר נפתי אבנון – מפקד יחידת ההסרטה), Nathan Gross, Al HaMishmar, 27.7.1977
- Naf died in the summer. (נף מת בקיץ), Niva Lanir-Palevsky, Davar, 31. August 1979
- Supplement to the dead in summer, Yaakov Tzur, Davar, 28.9.1979
- Conversation with Michael Salai (שיחה עם מיכאל סלעי), September 2002
- Conversation with Raya Gordon and Mimi Brafman (שיחות עם רעיה גורדון ומימי ברפמן), August 2002
- Sela Rona, Photography in Palestine – Eretz Israel in the 1930s and 1940s, Book accompanying an exhibition, Hakibbutz Hameuchad Publishing, Red Line, Herzliya Museum, Mai 2000, S. 46, 297
- Photographers of the Land, Publisher: Guy Raz, Mapa and Hakibbutz Hameuchad Publishing, 2003, S. 111–119. And they had to leave Germany. Photographers and their pictures 1928–1997, Hrsg.: Klaus Honnef / Frank Weyers (Author), Bonn, 1997, S. 39
