= Articulated Wall =

Sculpture in Denver, Colorado, U.S.

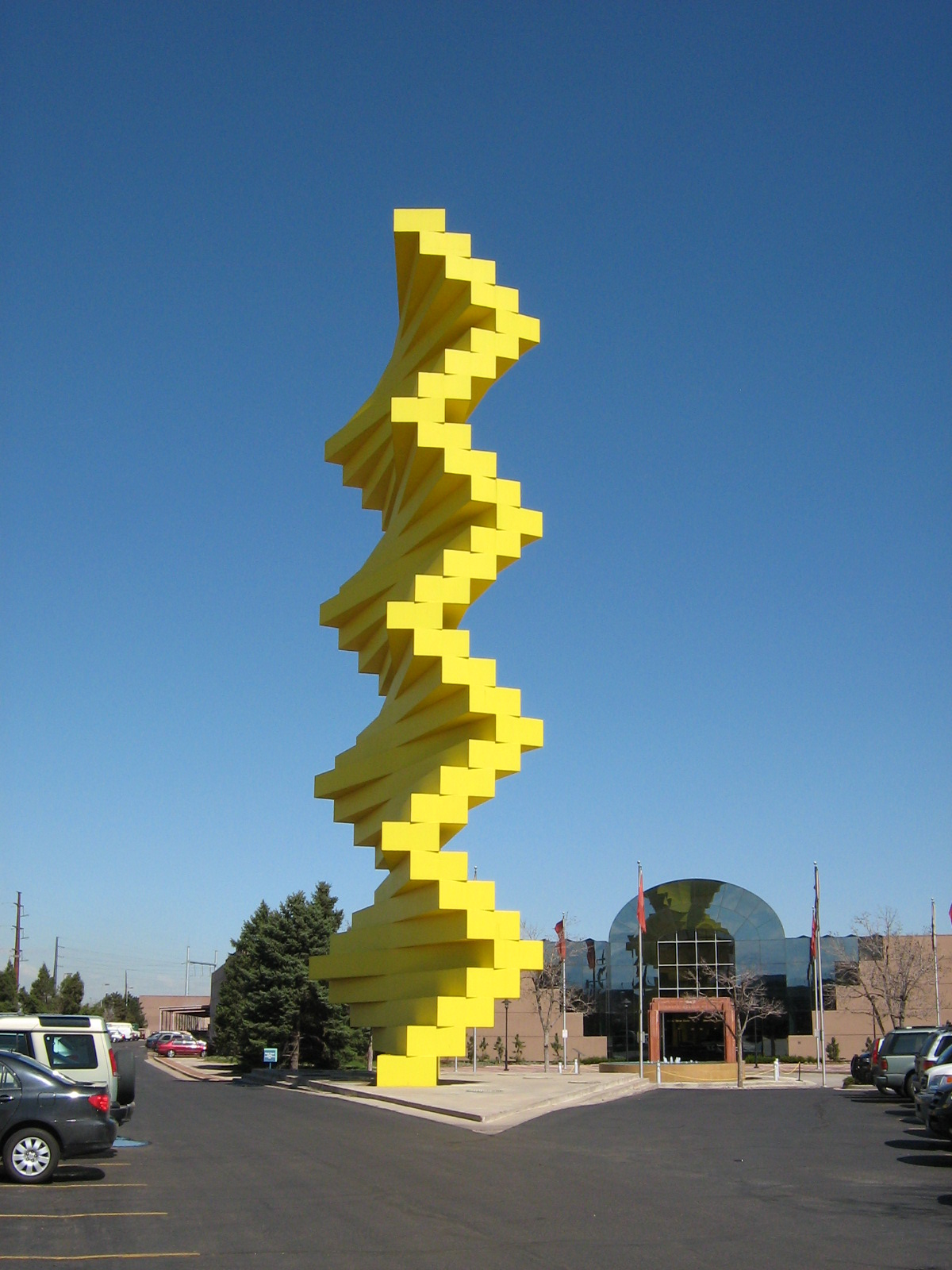
- The sculpture in 2007
- Artist: Herbert Bayer
- Location: Denver, Colorado, U.S.
- 39°42′20″N 104°59′26″W

Articulated Wall is a sculpture by Herbert Bayer, installed in Denver, Colorado, United States.
