= Irene Bayer-Hecht =

American photographer

Irene Bayer-Hecht (1898–1991) was an American born photographer involved in the Bauhaus movement. Her photographs "feature experimental approaches and candid views of life at the Bauhaus."

== Biography ==
Irene Hecht was born in Chicago in 1898. Hecht was Jewish. From 1920 to 1923 she studied at the Academy of Fine Arts, Berlin before acting as guest auditor at the Weimar State Bauhaus, Sorbonne and École de Beaux-Arts, Paris. In 1923, while attending the first large exhibition presented by the Bauhaus, she met Herbert Bayer and, through this connection, was able to attend the Bauhaus’s Vorkurs (foundation course, informally) without officially being enrolled as a student. At the same time, Hecht attended the Academy of Graphic Arts and Book Publishing in Leipzig, Germany.

Hecht married Herbert Bayer in 1925 and in 1926 they moved to the Bauhaus in Dessau. The two separated in 1928 and, although they did not divorce until 1944, had a daughter (Julia Alexandra) together in 1929.

Following her move to Berlin in 1928, Hecht's work was shown in the 'Film und Foto' Werkbund exhibition in Stuttgart.

In 1938 Bayer-Hecht returned to the United States due to the political implications of her Jewish origins in Germany at this time. Hecht ceased her photography and began working as a translator for the American military authorities in Munich. She returned to Europe from 1945 to 1947 to work as the chief of the American Photo Section in Munich before returning to California in 1947.

== Photography ==
Hecht both took her own photographs and used her technical skill in photography to support Bayer in his work. Hecht's work primarily focused on people, taking the form of both portraits and formal studies.

Her photographs were included in the Bauhaus exhibition Film und Foto, in 1929 and her work featured in the Thomas Walter Collection (1909–1949) that was exhibited at the Museum of Modern Art in New York City in 2014–2015.

Bayer-Hecht's work is included in the collections of the Museum of Modern Art, New York, the Getty Museum, and the National Gallery of Canada.

== Works ==
=== Female Student with Beach Ball (1925) ===
Female Student with Beach Ball is one of Irene Hayer's most popular photographs, captured using the gelatin silver print technique. The image features a Bauhaus student holding a large striped beach ball. The bold stripes on both her outfit and the ball highlight the shapes and lines, while the grainy, blurred background directs the focus to the student and the object. This photograph is a well-known example of Hayer's work, with her photographs often featuring experimental approaches and candid views of life at the Bauhaus.

=== Macaroni (1928) ===
Macaroni is a 1928 photograph by Irene Bayer-Hecht that depicts dry pasta arranged in a structured, patterned composition. Rather than presenting the subject in a casual manner, Bayer-Hecht carefully positioned the macaroni to highlight the shape and repetition. The use of strong lighting and deep shadows creates contrast and depth, allowing certain elements to stand out while others fade. The image transforms a common household item into something beautiful reflecting the Bauhaus's interest in finding aesthetic value in everyday objects.
