= Otti Berger =

Hungarian textile artist and weaver

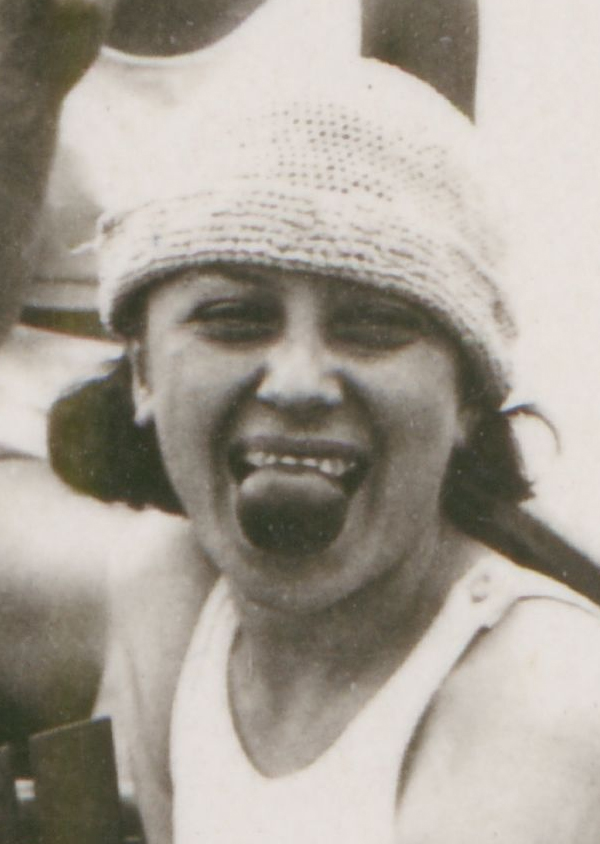
- Otti Berger ca 1927
- Born: Otilija Ester Berger; October 4, 1898; Zmajevac, Croatia, Austria-Hungary
- Died: May 3, 1944 (aged 45); Auschwitz, Poland
- Education: Bauhaus
- Known for: Textiles weaving

Otti Berger (Otilija Ester Berger) (4 October 1898, in present-day Zmajevac, Croatia - 3 May 1944) was a Croatian student and later teacher at the Bauhaus, where she was a textile artist and weaver. She was murdered in 1944 at Auschwitz during the Holocaust.

== Early life ==
Otti Berger was born on 4 October 1898 in present-day Zmajevac, Croatia. At the time of Berger’s birth, Zmajevac was part of the Baranya region of Austro-Hungary and was known as Vörösmart. Berger’s Jewish family was granted unrestricted residence and freedom in religion under the rule of Emperor Franz Joseph I. Because of Vörösmart’s national transition from Austro-Hungarian to Yugoslavian in 1918, and later Croatian, Berger’s nationality was and still is often mistaken. Though a native Hungarian speaker, Berger was also fluent in German. Due to a previous illness, Berger suffered from partial hearing loss, which was said to have heightened or enhanced her sense of touch.

== Education ==
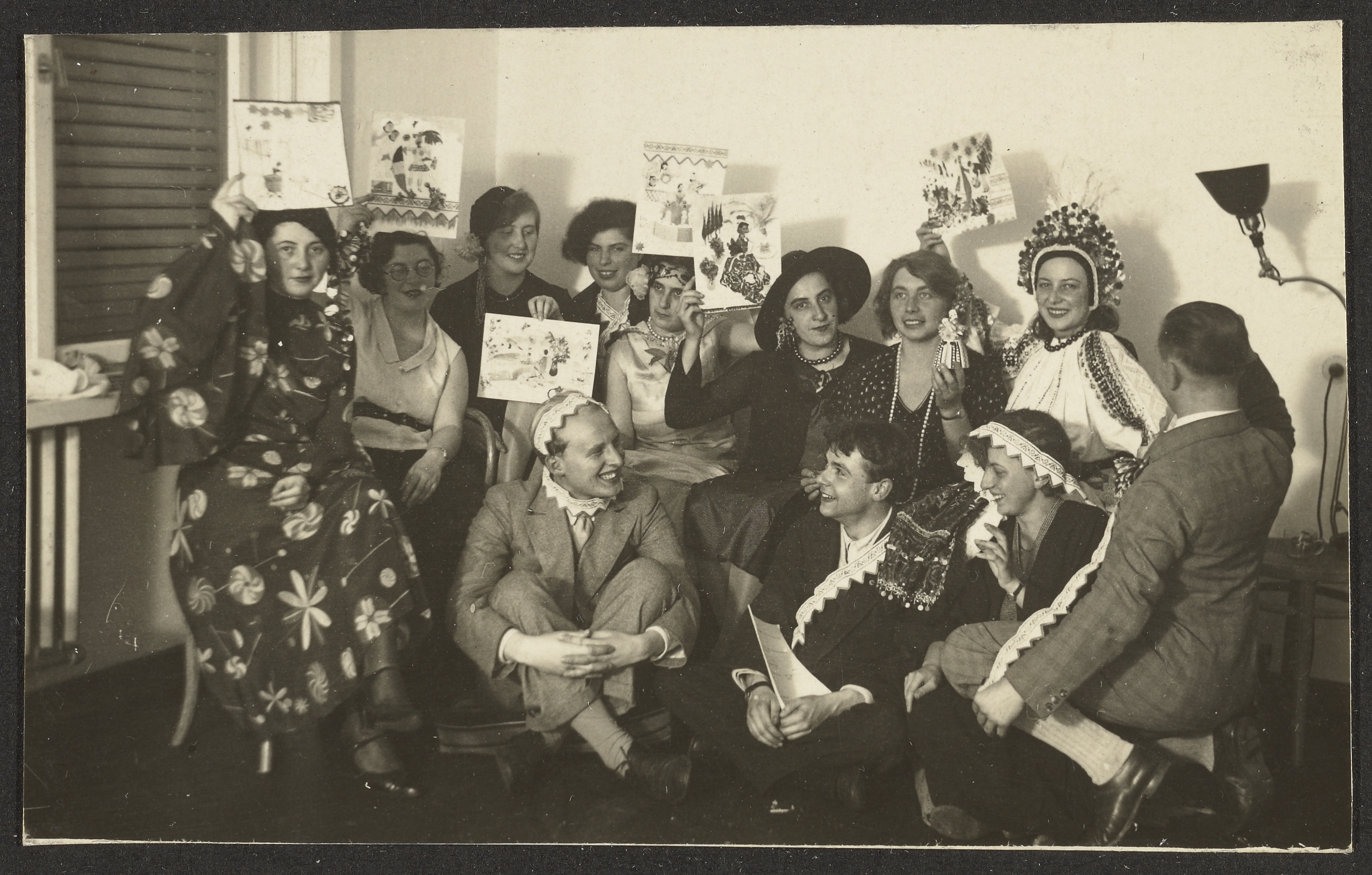
Party at Otti Berger's. Berger is at the back row far right, with an headdress. Digital image courtesy of the Getty's Open Content Program.

Berger was born in Zmajevac in Austro-Hungarian Empire (present-day Croatia). She completed education at the Collegiate School for Girls in Vienna before enrolling in the Royal Academy of Arts and Crafts in Zagreb, now the Academy of Fine Arts, University of Zagreb. She continued her studies in Zagreb until 1926 before attending Bauhaus in Dessau, Germany. There, Berger studied under László Moholy-Nagy, Paul Klee, and Wassily Kandinsky, among others. Berger has been described as "one of the most talented students at the weaving workshop in Dessau."

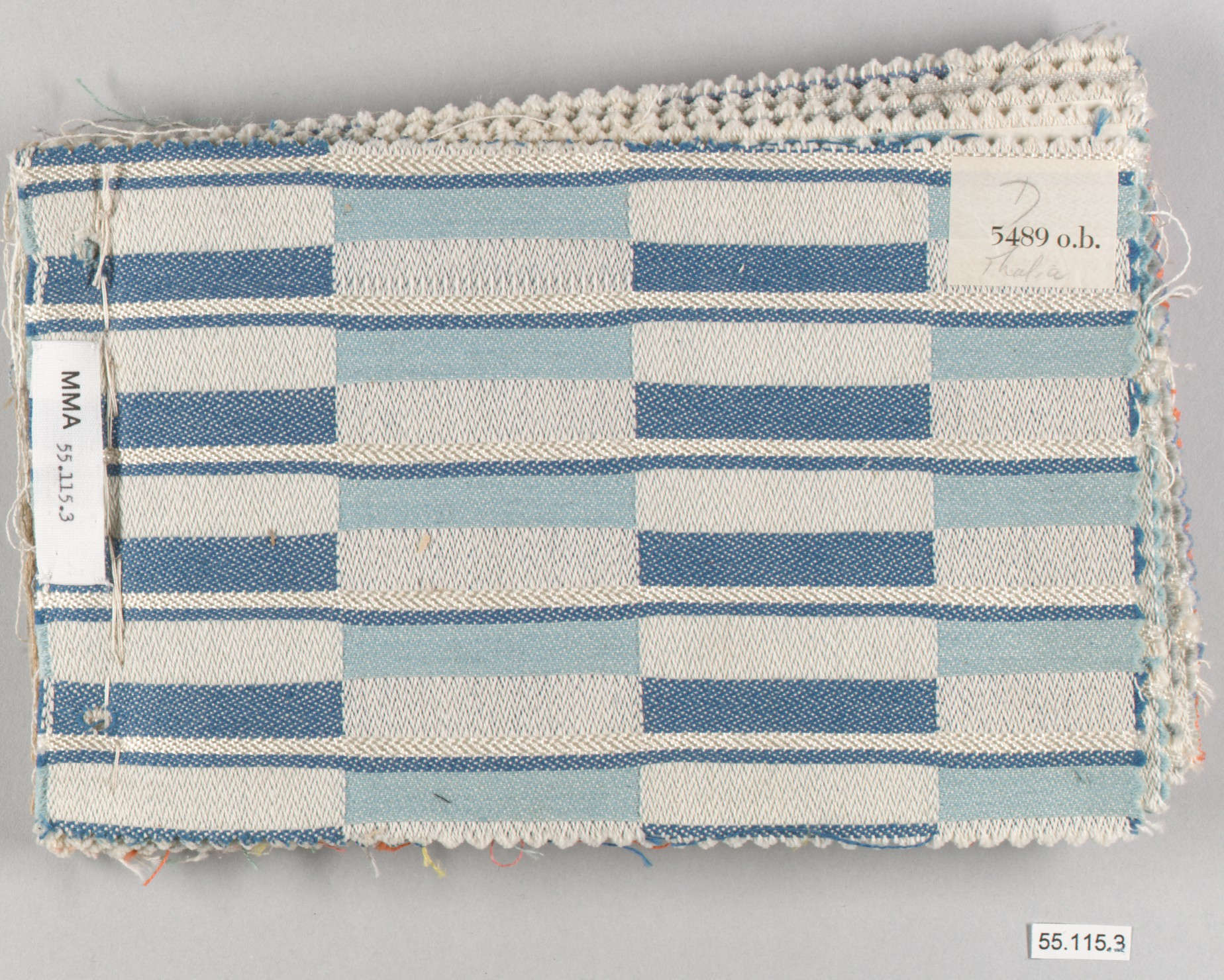
Sample textile designed by Otti Berger

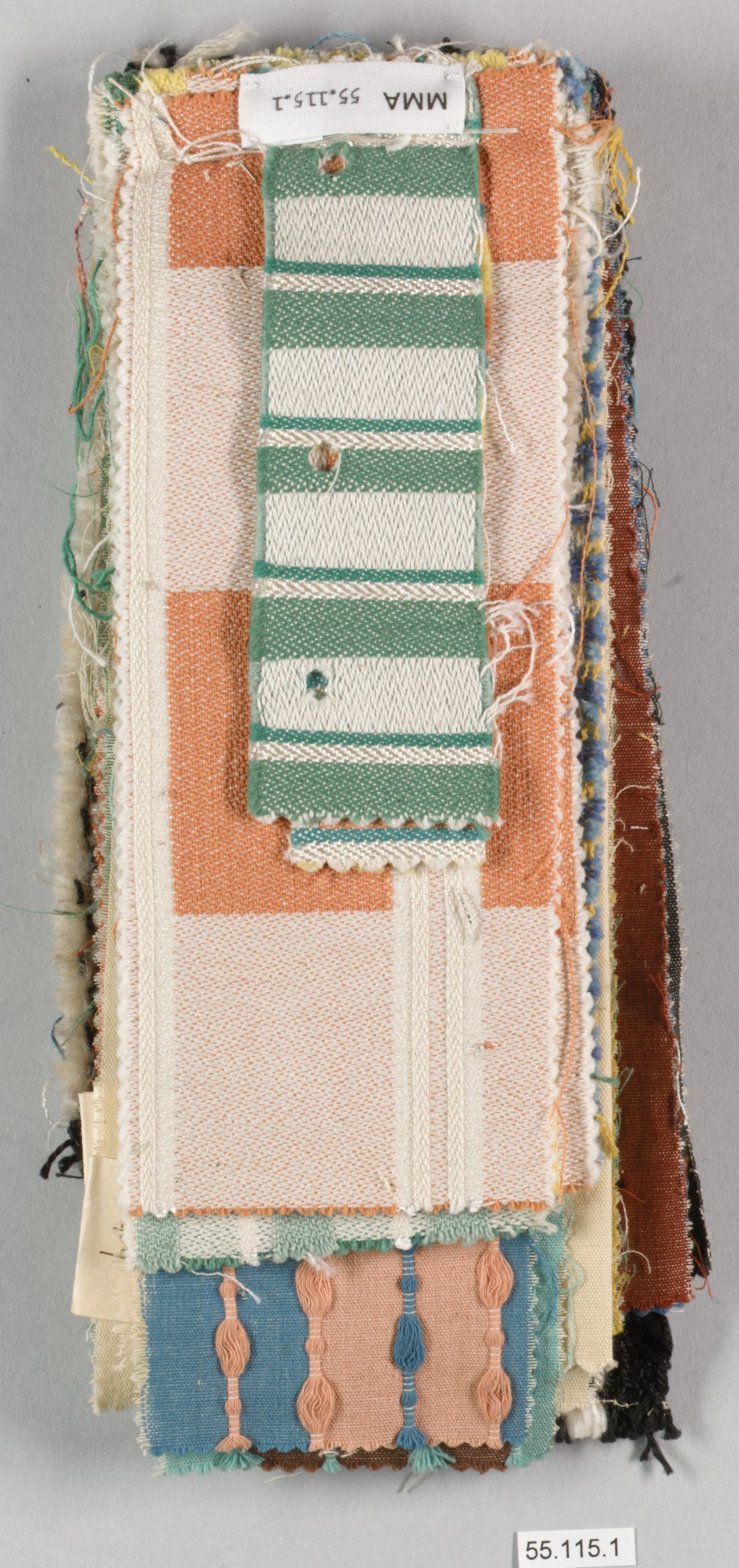
Sample textile book of 22 various designs by Berger using synthetic dyes and mercerized cotton.

A core member of the experimental approach to textiles at the Bauhaus, Berger experimented with methodology and materials during the course of her studies at the Bauhaus to eventually include plastic textiles intended for mass production. Along with Anni Albers and Gunta Stölzl, Berger pushed back against the understanding of textiles as a feminine craft and utilized rhetoric used in photography and painting to describe her work. During her time in Dessau, she also wrote a treatise on fabrics and the methodology of textile production, which stayed with Walter Gropius and was never published.

In 1929, Berger attended classes at Praktiska Vävnadsskolan in Stockholm where she wrote a nine-page thesis about Swedish Weaving techniques called 'Schwedische Bindungslehre', which later influenced her published weaving instructing booklet, Bindungslehre.

In 1931, Berger became the new head of weaving at the Bauhaus under the advisement of Stolzl, who had resigned from the position. She began to create her own curriculum, and acted as a mentor to younger Bauhaus students who carried on Bauhaus methods, including Paris-based weaver Zsuzsa Markos-Ney and Etel Fodor-Mittag, who became a hand weaver in South Africa. It was a short-lived position, however, as she was replaced in 1932 by Lilly Reich, the partner of new Bauhaus director Ludwig Mies van der Rohe.

== Career ==
When the Bauhaus closed under German force in 1932, Berger opened her own textile design studio, "otti berger atelier für textilien," which she ran from her apartment in Berlin using looms she purchased from the school's weaving workshop. There, her goal was to produce textiles for use in industry. She secured contracts with several design firms, including Wohnbedarf AG, a Swedish design company, and worked with manufacturers C.F. Baumgärtel & Sohn, Schriever and Websky, as well as Hartmann and Wiesen.

Berger was interested in authoring her own work and making a name for herself as a designer of woven textiles, which is uncommon in the industrial textile production field. She went so far as to begin signing her woven works with her initials in lowercase, “o.b.” In 1932, while working on designs for Wohnbedarf AG, Berger pushed for recognition, in fear that her work would be subjected to anonymity within the large design company. She asked that her prototypes be attached to the name “Otti Berger-Stoffe”, a request which was granted by Wohnbedarf.

In her continued efforts for recognition, Berger sought patents for some of her fabrics. In fact, she was the only weaver from the Bauhaus to apply for patents for her designs. Though she sought to patent three of her inventions, she received patents for only two - one in Germany in 1934 and the other in London in 1937.

== Last years ==
Not allowed to work in Germany under Nazi rule because of her Jewish roots, Berger closed her company down in 1936. She fled to London in 1937, where she was able to support herself with sporadic design contracts, including work with Helios Ltd and Marianne Straub. However, her hearing impairment and language barrier made life in England difficult. In a letter to a friend, Berger penned, "The English are very reserved. I believe it will take ten years before one has a circle of friends. I am always alone and find it difficult because I do not know English and cannot hear."

Over the course of several years, Berger's attempts to emigrate to United States to work with her fiancé Ludwig Hilberseimer and other Bauhaus professors failed. László Moholy-Nagy had offered her a place as head of weaving at the New Bauhaus in Chicago, which she would never reach. She wrote to Naum Gabo, Walter Gropius, and other friends trying to gain a teaching visa in 1937 but never acquired one. Due to the political state in England as war approached, Berger's distaste for England grew. Against the pleas of close friends, Berger returned to her homeland of Zmajevac in 1938 to help her family with her mother's poor health. After several years spent with family, in April 1944 Berger was deported alongside her brother, half-brother, and his wife to a detention camp in Mohács. Shortly thereafter in May 1944, they were transferred to Auschwitz concentration camp in April 1944. Only Berger's brother, Otto, survived. He speculated that Otti had been killed with German gas due to her lack of hearing.

== Impact ==
Otti Berger's work was influential across Europe due to various patents on her designs. She had her works published in magazines such as Der Konfektionar, the Dutch multi-lingual magazine International Textiles, the Swedish magazine Spektrum, and Domus magazine. Otti Berger partnered with Dutch weaving company De Ploeg where her designs were sold to furniture factories that produced stock for De Bijenkorf and Metz and Co department stores.

In 1933, Berger published "Rätta stoffer pa rätt plats" ("The Right Fabrics in the Right Place") which influenced many Swedish designers to reconsider their designs for housing textiles so that they "fulfill the demands and needs of [the] time."

Berger's works have been exhibited at museums internationally such as the Busch-Reisinger Museum, the Metropolitan Museum of Art, and collected at Harvard Universities' exhibit "The Bauhaus and Harvard," and the Ludwig Hilberseimer collection at the Art Institute of Chicago.

== Quote ==
The handling of fabric is of primary importance. A piece of fabric must be touched and felt; it has to be held in the hands. The beauty of a fabric is above all known by its feel. The feel of fabric in the hands can be just as beautiful an experience as colour can be to the eye or sound to the ear.

— Otti Berger, "Stoffe im Raum", or "Fabric for the Home"

== Gallery ==
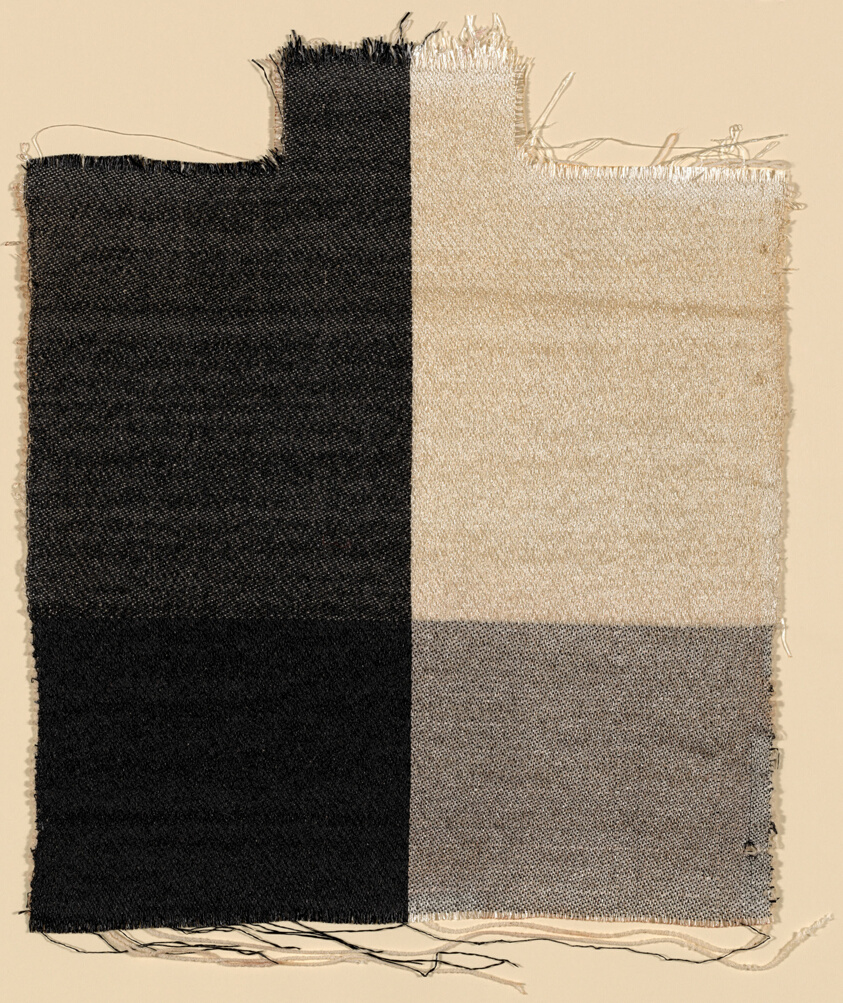
Sample (Upholstery Fabric) by Otti Berger, cellophane and cotton, 43.1 × 37 cm (17 × 14 1/2 in.), 1927-1933

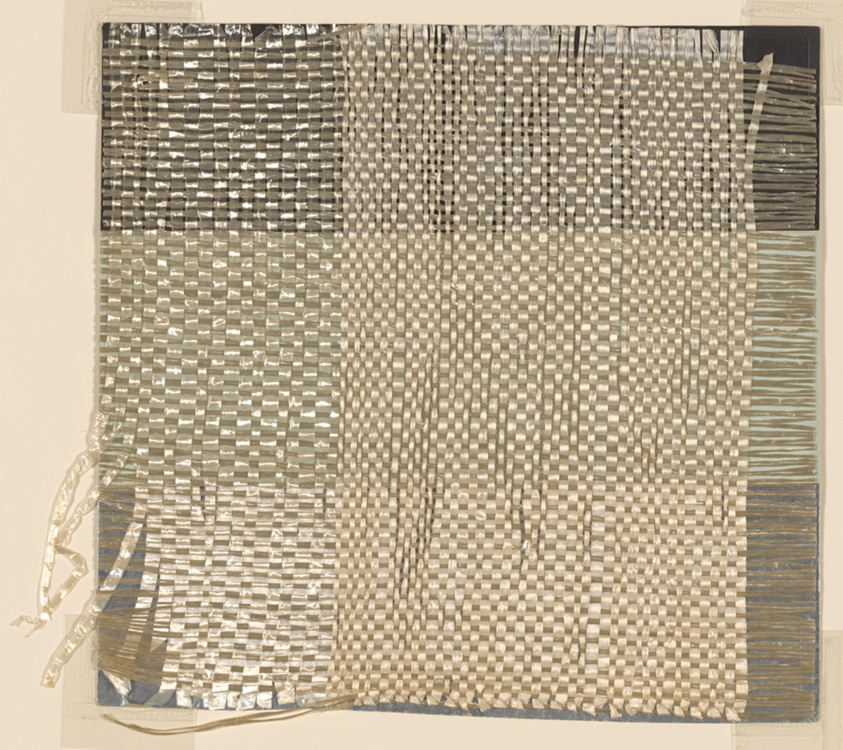
Sample (Upholstery Fabric) by Otti Berger, cellophane, 27.3 × 26.1 cm (10 3/4 × 10 1/4 in.), 1927-1933

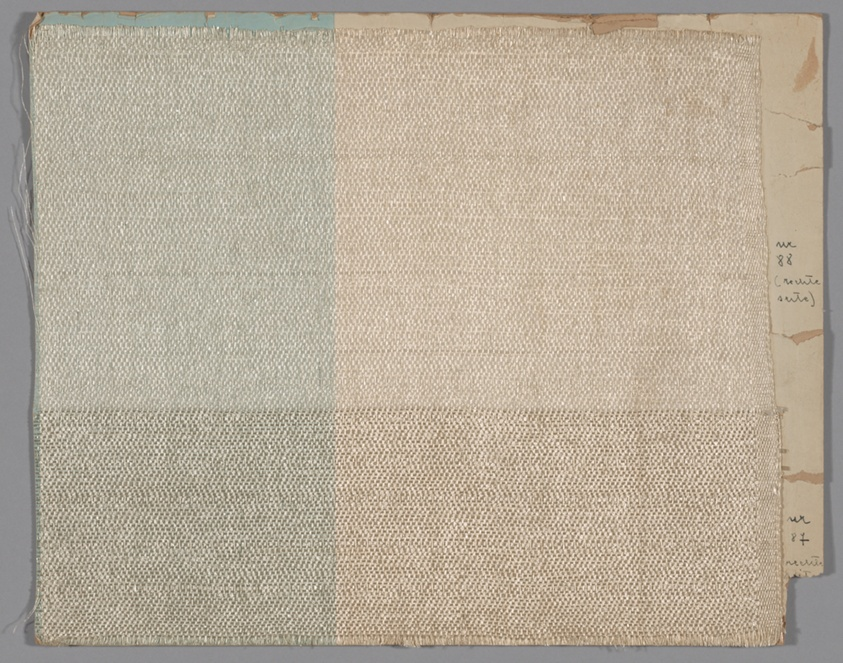
Sample (Upholstery Fabric) by Otti Berger, cellophane, 31.8 × 38 cm (12 1/2 × 15 in.), 1927-1933

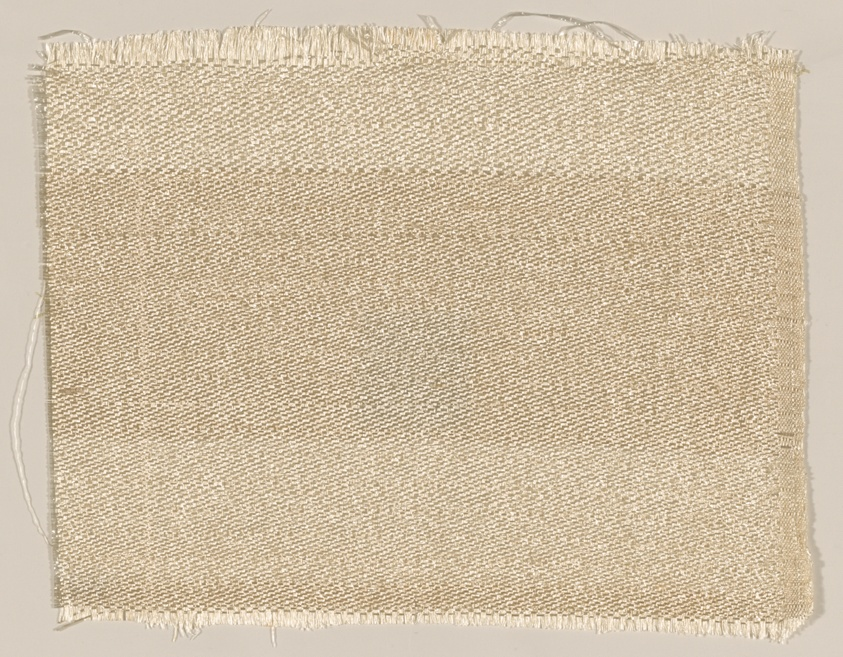
Sample (Upholstery Fabric) by Otti Berger, cellophane, 26.2 × 33 cm (10 1/4 × 13 1/8 in.), 1927-1933

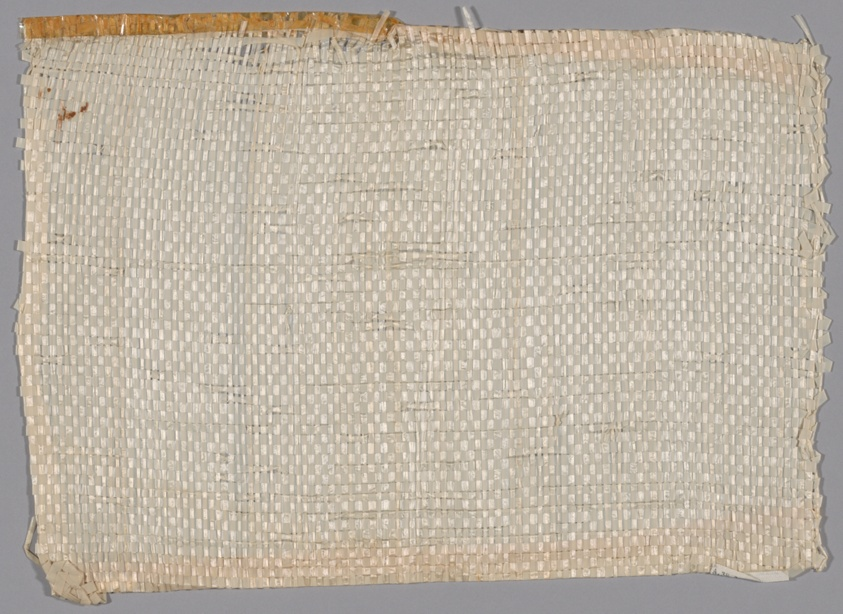
Sample (Upholstery Fabric) by Otti Berger, cellophane, 35.5 × 45.8 cm (14 × 18 in.), 1927-1933

== See also ==
- Anni Albers
- Friedl Dicker-Brandeis
- Margaretha Reichard
- Gunta Stölzl
- Ivana Tomljenović-Meller
