= Brigitte Peterhans =

German-American architect (1928–2021)

Brigitte Peterhans (born Brigitte Schlaich, 27 August 1928 – 15 January 2021) was a German-American architect.

== Biography ==
Brigitte Schlaich was born in Sulz am Neckar, Germany on 27 August 1928. She received her Diplom-Ingenieur in 1960 from the University of Stuttgart. Encouraged by Myron Goldsmith, she studied at the Illinois Institute of Technology as a Fulbright fellow (1956-1957) where she received her Master of Architecture in 1962.

In 1957, she married the photographer and former Bauhaus teacher Walter Peterhans, who at that time was teaching at the Illinois Institute of Technology. She was the sister of the structural engineer Jörg Schlaich.

In 1958, while still a student, she was hired by Skidmore Owings and Merrill. She remained at SOM on and off for thirty three years, working with Bruce Graham and Myron Goldsmith on domestic and international projects. Her career included contributions to projects such Arab International Bank World Trade Center and Hotel, Cairo, Egypt, 1976-1978, 1985-1990; Artigas Foundation, Gallifa, Spain 1985-1989; Baxter Travenol Headquarters and Laboratories, Deerfield, Illinois, 1973-1980; Broadgate Exchange House, London, 1987-1990; Max Eyth Footbridge, Stuttgart, Germany, 1989; Perimeter Center, Atlanta, Georgia, 1981-1986; Sears Tower, Chicago, Illinois, 1970-1972, 1980.

In 1973, Peterhans became an associate at SOM, and an associate partner in 1979. She retired in 1990.

Peterhans died in Stuttgart 15 January 2021, at the age of 92.
