= Elsa Thiemann =

German photographer (1910–1981)

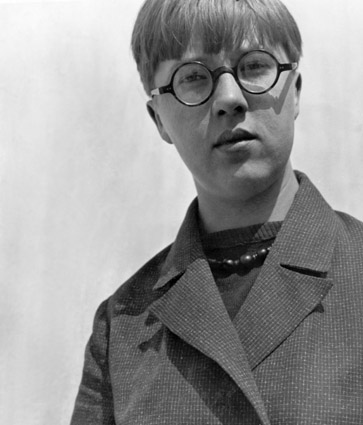
- Born: 7 February 1910; Toruń, West Prussia
- Died: 15 November 1981 (aged 71); Hamburg, West Germany
- Other name: Elsa Franke-Thiemann
- Education: Bauhaus
- Occupation: Photographer
- Spouse: Hans Thiemann (married 1947–1977)

Elsa Thiemann (née Franke, 7 February 1910 – 15 November 1981) was a German photographer and former Bauhaus student. She also designed wallpaper based on photograms.

== Personal life and education ==
Elsa Thiemann was born in Toruń, West Prussia, which is now part of Poland. In 1921 her family moved to the Neukölln suburb of Berlin. Supported by her middle class family, she attended the Kunstgewerbe- und Handwerkerschule in Berlin-Charlottenberg and following that, the Vereinigte Staatsschulen für Freie und Angewandte Kunst. Both institutions were predecessors of the present day Universität der Künste Berlin (Berlin University of the Arts).

She studied at the Bauhaus from 1929, receiving her Bauhaus Diploma in July 1931. In the first year she undertook Josef Albers' preliminary course, and then studied photography under Walter Peterhans, in a course that was affiliated with the Printing and Advertising workshop. She also attended painting courses given by Wassily Kandinsky and Paul Klee.

Her wallpaper designs were never commercially produced as part of the Bauhaus wallpaper collection, as they were very different from the other patterns which were mainly bright and cheerful. Her work was composed of collaged dark photograms produced using plants, thread, and blobs of paint.

Franke met the painter Hans Thiemann (1910–1977) at the Bauhaus and they lived together in Berlin after he completed his studies in 1933.

== Work ==
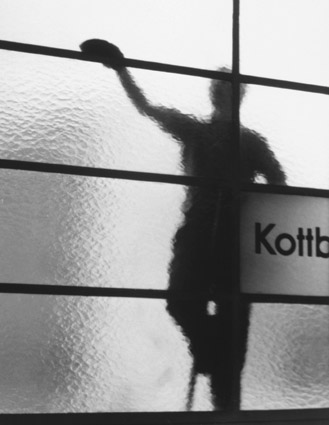
Window cleaner at Kottbusser Tor U-Bahn Station, Berlin, by Elsa Thiemann c.1946

From 1931 Thiemann worked in Berlin as a freelance photographer and a press photographer and, in order to do such work during the Nazi period, she joined the Reichskulturkammer in 1934, as all working artists had to do. She had anti-Nazi views and Hans Thiemann's surrealist art work was considered degenerate, so to keep a low profile she avoided taking photos that might seem to make political statements, instead photographing ordinary street scenes, particularly around Hertzbergstrasse in the Neukölln area where she lived, often taking photos directly from her apartment windows. During World War II, the couple stayed in Berlin and Elsa worked as editorial assistant for the publishers Hoffmann and Campe.

Hans was associated with the Fantasten (Dreamers) artists' group in Berlin, and Elsa took many portraits of both Hans and the other members of the group.

She is well-known now for her street photography of Berlin before the war, and for her photographs of the ruins of Berlin after the war.

Elsa and Hans Thiemann were married in 1947. When Hans accepted a position at the Hochschule für bildende Künste Hamburg (University of Fine Arts, Hamburg) in 1960, she stopped creating photographic work.

Thiemann died in Hamburg on 15 November 1981. Her works are held by the Museum Neukölln, the Bauhaus Dessau Foundation and the Bauhaus Archive in Berlin. Examples of her wallpaper designs from her Bauhaus years are sold as gift wrap by the Bauhaus Archive shop. A solo retrospective of her work was presented by the Bauhaus Archive in 2004.

Thiemann's work was included in the 2021 exhibition Women in Abstraction at the Centre Pompidou.
