= Ivana Tomljenović-Meller =

- Born: 1906
- Died: 1988 (aged 81–82); Zagreb, SFR Yugoslavia
- Education: Royal College for Arts and Crafts, Zagreb (1924–1928); Bauhaus (1929–1930)
- Occupations: Graphic designer, art teacher
- Spouse: Alfred Meller m.1932–1935 (his death)

Ivana Tomljenović-Meller (1906–1988), born Ivana Tomljenović, was a graphic designer and art teacher from Zagreb who attended the Bauhaus art school in Germany.

Her main interests were photography and poster design. She was also a semi-professional athlete.

== Biography ==
She studied at the Royal College for Arts and Crafts in Zagreb, now the Academy of Fine Arts, University of Zagreb, from 1924 to 1928, and after graduating went to the Kunstgewerbeschule (a college of applied arts) in Vienna, now the University of Applied Arts Vienna. However, she left Vienna in 1929 to attend the Bauhaus in Dessau. After undertaking Josef Albers' first year preliminary course she started the photography course taught by Walter Peterhans.

Tomljenović-Meller took many informal photographs of everyday life at the Bauhaus, showing students in the canteen, and relaxing and socialising. These document the Neues Sehen (New Vision), an avantgarde movement of the 1920s and 1930s espoused by László Moholy-Nagy and Alexander Rodchenko. It encouraged photography of ordinary scenes which used unfamiliar perspectives and angles, close-up details, use of light and shadow, and experimentation with multiple exposure.

Her father, Dr. Tomislav Tomljenović (1877–1945), was a prominent Croatian politician and lawyer, and although she came from an affluent middle-class family, she joined the Communist Party of Germany and became politically active. When Hannes Meyer was dismissed from his post as Bauhaus director in August 1930, all known Communist students were also thrown out. A number of others, like Tomljenović, left in solidarity.

Tomljenović-Meller then went to Berlin and worked as a poster designer, and as a stage designer with the Dadaist artist John Heartfield on a theater set for Communist director Erwin Piscator. In the same period she participated in the European championship in Czech handball. She then moved to Paris in 1931 to study literature at the Sorbonne. In 1932 she moved to Prague and married Alfred Meller, owner of the ROTA advertising company. After Meller's death in 1935, Tomljenović-Meller returned to Zagreb and later moved to Belgrade, where she taught poster design. She returned to Zagreb in 1938 to teach at the Third State High School for Women. She stopped teaching during WWII, but resumed after the war was over until retiring in 1962.

Tomljenović-Meller died in Zagreb in 1988.

== See also ==
- Avantgarde Museum. Samples of Ivana Tomljenovic-Meller's poster design work
- Otti Berger
- Söre Popitz
