= Skokie Public Library =

American library in Skokie, Illinois

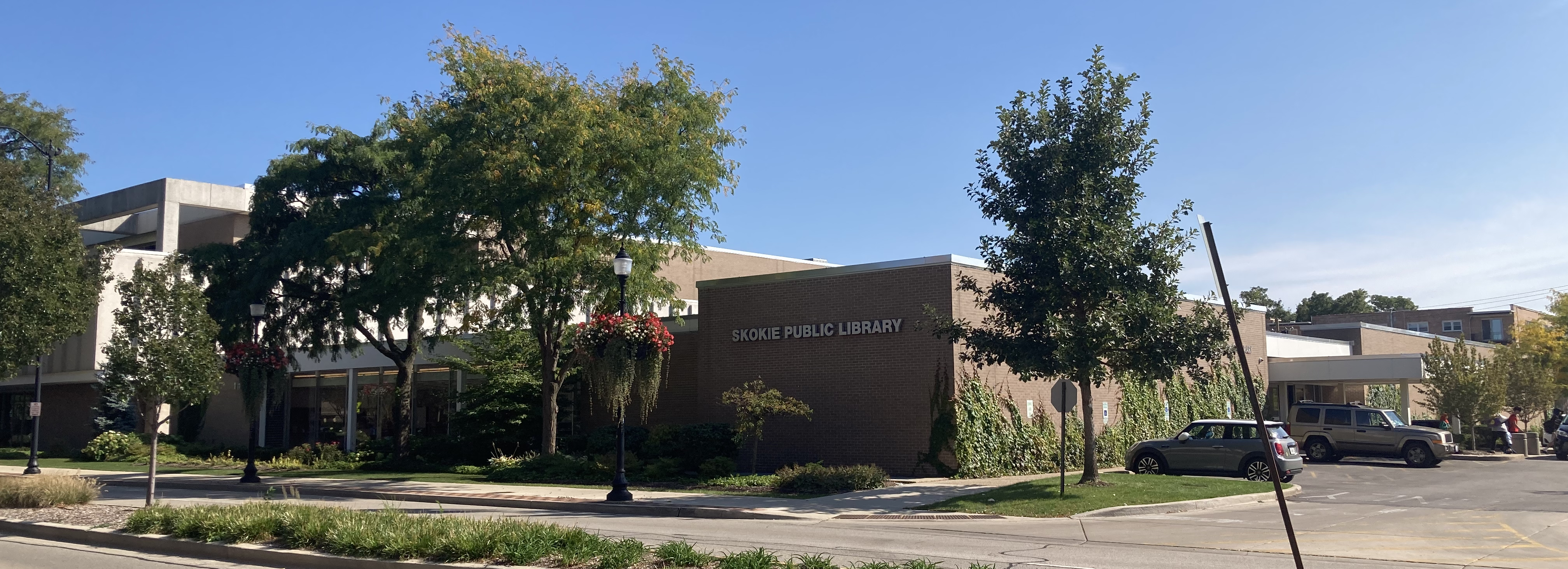
- 42.0258°N 87.7579°W
- Location: Skokie, Illinois, United States
- Type: Public
- Established: July 1929

Other information
- Website: skokielibrary.info

Skokie Public Library has been serving the community of Skokie, Illinois since 1930.

== History ==
The library was first organized in July 1929 by the Cosmos Club of Niles Center, one of two Woman's Clubs in Niles Center at the time. The library first opened its doors in February 1930 in rented rooms at the corner of Oakton Street and Lincoln Avenue. It operated on book donations and volunteer staff. The library was open for 10 hours a week and had a materials collection of 1,000 books. In 1941, voters approved a tax-supported library which brought Skokie Public Library, formerly the Niles Center Free Public Library, reliable funding.

In April 1933, the library re-opened in remodeled space in the Municipal Building with a collection of 3,000 volumes and 900 borrower's cards. The library was still funded by fundraising and donations at the time, but in 1934, the Village gave the library a small appropriation to the Cosmos Club to hire a part-time librarian. The first full-time librarian was hired in 1937.

In March 1942, the library re-opened at 4913 Oakton Street. The building was divided in half with the other half occupied by the United States Post Office. The library expanded to fill the entire building when the United States Post Office moved to a new location in 1952.

It wasn't until 1960 that the library got its permanent home at 5215 Oakton Street, right across from Village Hall. The building was designed by Gertrude Lempp Kerbis of Skidmore, Owings, and Merrill. In 1971, a building expansion, designed by architecture firm Hammond & Roesch, expanded the building's footprint to the east and added a second floor to the library. In 2003, another major renovation designed by Robert D. Hunter of O'Donnell, Wicklund, Pigozzi & Peterson brought the third floor. With Andrew Berman Architect, the library completed an interior renovation project in 2021. This renovation modernized the first and second floors.

In 2020, Skokie Public Library went fine free.

== Branches ==
Skokie Public Library's main branch is located in downtown Skokie. Its mobile branch, the bookmobile, had its first ride in 1957. The bookmobile originally traveled to 8 destinations in Skokie; it has since expanded to 16 stops. The artwork on the bookmobile is by local artist, Jay Ryan.

== Accolades ==
The library has received numerous awards and special recognition throughout the years. The library has received a five-star ranking from Library Journal, and was the first public library in Illinois to be awarded the National Medal for Museum and Library Service in 2008.

In 1960, the library won the Chicago Municipal Art League award for excellence in architecture. In 1963, the library was the recipient of the American Institute of Architects and the American Librarian Association First Honor Award for Library Buildings.

In 1982, Skokie Public Library was depicted in a cachet by Skokie artist Doris Gold for the "Libraries of America" commemorative postage stamp issued by the U.S. Postal Service.
