= Athletics at the 1928 Summer Olympics – Women's discus throw =

Women's discus throw at the Games of the IX Olympiad
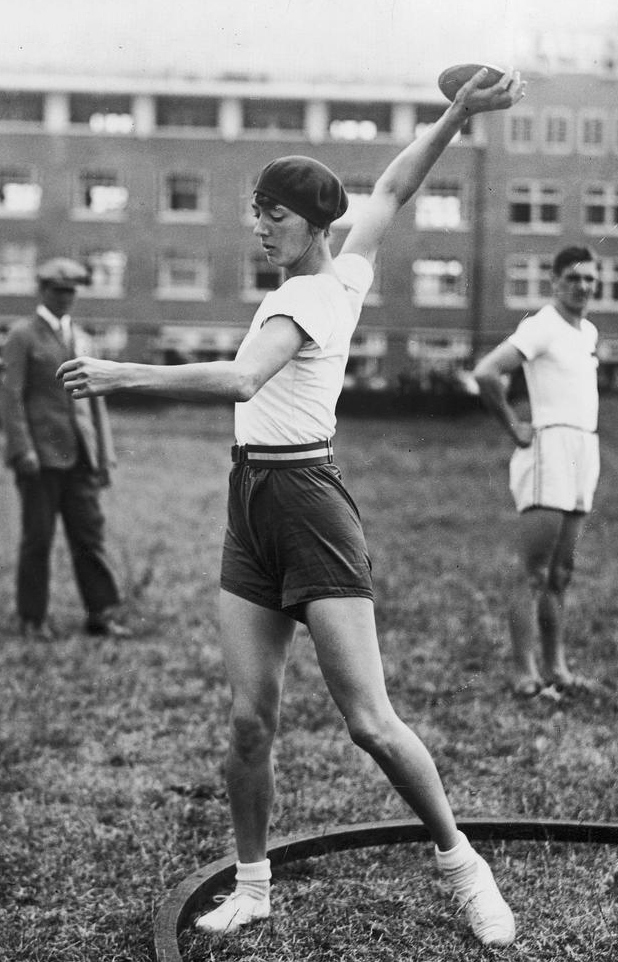
- Halina Konopacka in 1928 Summer Olympics in Amsterdam
- Venue: Olympic Stadium
- Date: July 31, 1928
- Competitors: 21 from 12 nations
- Winning distance: 39.62 m

Medalists
1st place, gold medalist(s)		Halina Konopacka	Poland
2nd place, silver medalist(s)		Lillian Copeland	United States
3rd place, bronze medalist(s)		Ruth Svedberg	Sweden

The women's discus throw event was part of the track and field athletics programme at the 1928 Summer Olympics. It was the first medal decision of a women's event in Olympic athletics. The competition was held on Tuesday, July 31, 1928. Twenty-one discus throwers from twelve nations competed.

== Records ==
These were the standing world and Olympic records (in metres) prior to the 1928 Summer Olympics.

World record	39.18	(Poland) Halina Konopacka	Warsaw (POL)	September 4, 1927
Olympic record		-		

In the final Halina Konopacka set a new world record with 39.62 metres.

== Results ==
The best six throwers qualified for the final. The throwing order and the throwing series are not available. The final was held on the same day and started at 2 p.m.

Rank	Athlete	Nation	Qual.	Final	Notes
1st place, gold medalist(s)	Halina Konopacka	Poland	39.17	39.62	WR
2nd place, silver medalist(s)	Lillian Copeland	United States	36.66	37.08	
3rd place, bronze medalist(s)	Ruth Svedberg	Sweden	34.68	35.92	
4	Milly Reuter	Germany	34.75	35.86	
5	Grete Heublein	Germany	35.56	35.56	
6	Liesl Perkaus	Austria	33.54	33.54	
7	Maybelle Reichardt	United States	33.52	Did not advance	
8	Genowefa Kobielska	Poland	32.72	Did not advance	
9	Charlotte Mäder	Germany	32.22	Did not advance	
10	Lucienne Velu	France	31.29	Did not advance	
11	Lena Michaëlis	Netherlands	31.04	Did not advance	
12	Paula Mollenhauer	Germany	30.94	Did not advance	
13	Piera Borsani	Italy	30.67	Did not advance	
14	Elfrīda Karlsone	Latvia	30.60	Did not advance	
15	Rena MacDonald	United States	30.25	Did not advance	
16	Erzsébet Ruda	Hungary	29.65	Did not advance	
17	Bets Dekens	Netherlands	29.36	Did not advance	
18	Berta Jikeli	Romania	28.19	Did not advance	
19	Margaret Jenkins	United States	27.07	Did not advance	
20	Lucie Petit-Diagre	Belgium	25.28	Did not advance	
21	Jenny Toitgans	Belgium	24.40	Did not advance	
