= Children's follow-up Clinic (Kindernachsorgeklinik) Berlin-Brandenburg =

Hospital in Germany

Coordinates: 52°43′58″N 13°29′09″E

The Children's Follow-up Clinic (Kindernachsorgeklinik) Berlin-Brandenburg gGmbH in Bernau bei Berlin is a non-profit family-oriented rehabilitation center for children with cancer and heart defects. This clinic was founded on 13 March 2009.

The Children's Follow-up Clinic follows a family-oriented rehabilitation (FOR) concept which has been modelled after the "Nachsorgeklinik Tannheim".

The clinic consists of four detached two-storey buildings, each with living units and a home therapy. In addition to medical care, occupational therapy, physiotherapy and psychotherapy, the clinic offers a daycare, a school, a swimming pool, a sports hall and a youth club. It has a capacity for 28 patients and 72 family members.

The clinic is located in the Waldsiedlung, a district of Bernau near Berlin. The buildings formerly belonged to the East German government.

== Shareholders ==
- Deutsche Kinderkrebsnachsorge – Foundation for the chronically ill children
- Deutsches Herzzentrum Berlin
- Carpe Diem – Foundation for cancer and heart disease in children
- Bundesverband Herzkranke Kinder e.V. (BVHK)
- Michels Kliniken GmbH & Co. KG
