= Erzsébet Ruda =

Hungarian discus thrower

Personal information
- Nationality: Hungarian
- Born: 22 August 1904
- Died: 2 April 1991 (aged 86)

Sport
- Sport: Athletics
- Event: Discus throw

Erzsébet Ruda (22 August 1904 – 2 April 1991) was a Hungarian athlete. She competed in the women's discus throw at the 1928 Summer Olympics.
