= Charlotte Mäder =

German discus thrower

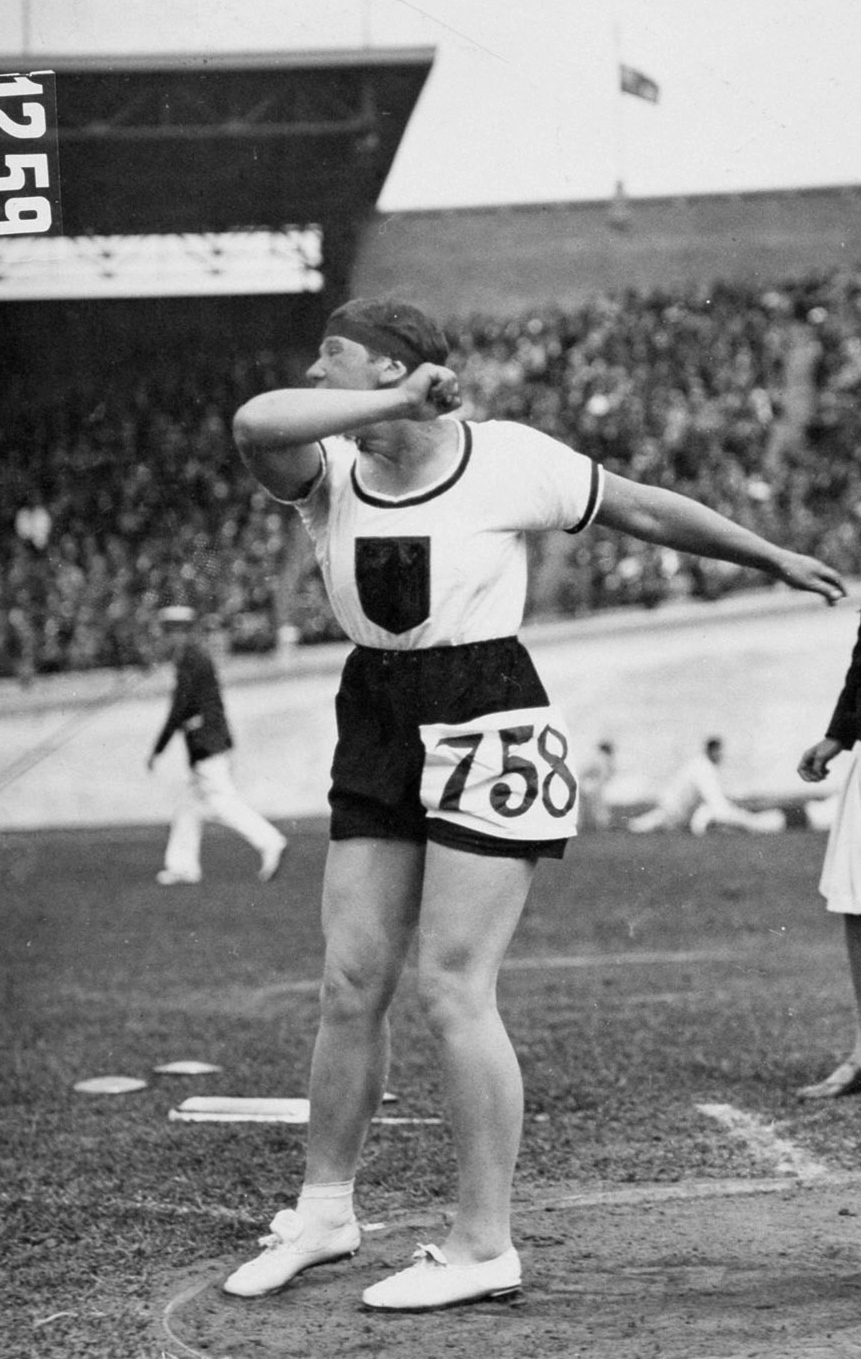
- Mäder at the 1928 Olympics

Personal information
- Born: 18 July 1905 Bernau bei Berlin, Province of Brandenburg, German Empire
- Height: 162 cm (5 ft 4 in)
- Weight: 69 kg (152 lb)

Sport
- Sport: Athletics
- Event(s): Discus throw, shot put, javelin throw
- Club: SC Bernau, Bernau bei Berlin

Achievements and titles
- Personal best(s): DT – 37.65 m (1930); SP – 9.95 m (1926); JT – 29.62 m (1926)

Charlotte Mäder (born 18 July 1905, date of death unknown) was a German track and field athlete. She competed at the 1928 Summer Olympics in the discus throw and placed ninth. Between 1926 and 1930 Mäder was ranked among world's best 10 discus throwers; she was also a leading German javelin thrower and shot putter.
