= Jenny Toitgans =

Belgian discus thrower

Personal information
- Nationality: Belgian
- Born: 28 March 1905

Sport
- Sport: Athletics
- Event: Discus throw

Jenny Toitgans (28 March 1905 – 22 October 1986) was a Belgian athlete. She competed in the women's discus throw at the 1928 Summer Olympics.
