= ADGB Trade Union School =

Training centre complex in Brandenburg, Germany

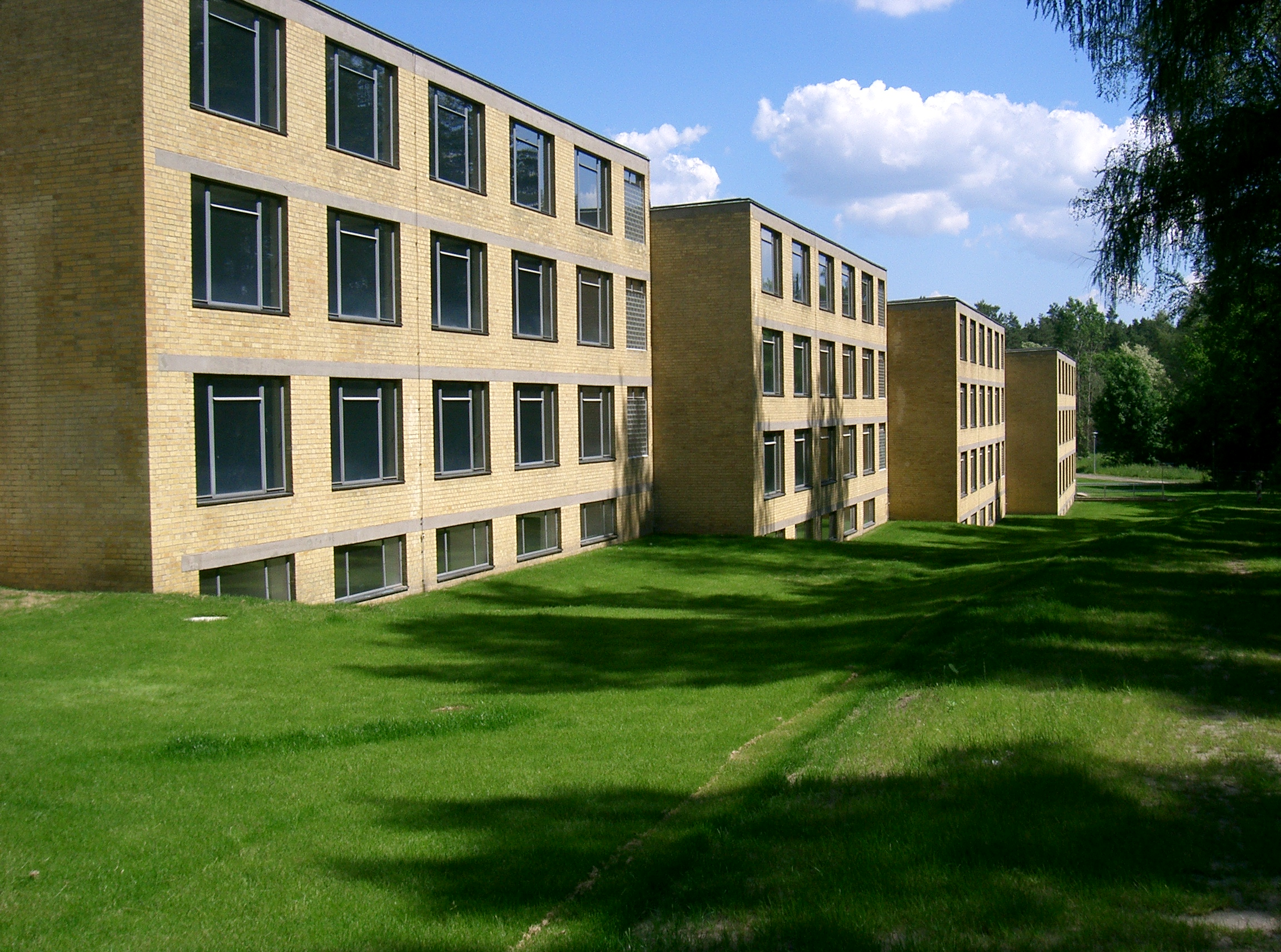
- Residential blocks, ADGB Trade Union School

- Location within Brandenburg Location within Germany
- Alternative names: Bundesschule des Allgemeinen Deutschen Gewerkschaftsbundes

General information
- Status: Restored
- Type: Education and Training Complex
- Architectural style: International modern
- Location: Hannes-Meyer-Campus 1, 16321 Bernau bei Berlin, Bernau bei Berlin, Germany
- Coordinates: 52°42′23″N 13°32′38″E
- Construction started: 1928
- Completed: 1930
- Cost: ~EU 28 million (2007 renovation)
- Client: Allgemeiner Deutscher Gewerkschaftsbund

Technical details
- Structural system: Brick, concrete, steel, glass

Design and construction
- Architects: Hannes Meyer; Hans Wittwer

UNESCO World Heritage Site
- Type: Cultural
- Criteria: ii, iv, vi
- Designated: 1996 (20th session), modified 2017 (41st session)
- Reference no.: 729bis-003
- Region: Europe and North America

The ADGB Trade Union School (Bundesschule des Allgemeinen Deutschen Gewerkschaftsbundes (ADGB)), is a training centre complex in Bernau bei Berlin, Germany. It was built for the former General German Trade Union Federation, from 1928 to 1930. It is a textbook example of Bauhaus functionalist architecture, both in the finished product and in the analytical and collaborative approach used to develop the design and complete the project. Next to the Bauhaus Dessau building, it was the second-largest project ever undertaken by the Bauhaus.

It was designed by the Bauhaus director Hannes Meyer, with Hans Wittwer, who taught the Bauhaus building theory course alongside Meyer. The two architects, both Swiss, had also worked together in their hometown, Basel. Students from the building theory course and other areas of the Bauhaus were also involved with the design, construction and interior fitting of the complex.

In 2017 the ADGB Trade Union School was added to the UNESCO World Heritage Site the Bauhaus and its Sites in Weimar, Dessau and Bernau.

== Purpose ==
The school was built to train administrators and leaders of the trade union movement in subjects such as labour law, industrial hygiene, management and economics. The complex included on-site accommodation and catering for both teaching staff and trainees, sports facilities and an outdoor swimming pool.

== Architecture ==
=== Concept ===
The complex is a classic example of functionalist architecture and reflects Meyer's philosophy that buildings should be focused on meeting their users' specific needs. In Meyer and Wittwer's building theory classes students were taught to scientifically analyse both the client's requirements and the site conditions. Students carried out environmental studies at the site, such as how the sunlight entering the buildings would change during the day. The buildings were designed to fit the topography of the site, the client's needs and to facilitate social interaction.

In keeping with the Bauhaus philosophy of teaching via practical experience and working with industry, a number of students from the building theory course were involved in the project, including Arieh Sharon, Konrad Püschel, Philipp Tolziner, Lotte Stam-Beese, and Edmund Collein. As well as giving the students training in draughting and project management, it also gave them experience with the practical aspects of building, such as brick laying, painting and laying concrete. Following Meyer's socialist principles, this had the aim of encouraging close interaction between the students and the building site workers. "Meyer’s was a holistic approach to architecture, making no distinction between masters and students, or site managers and skilled tradesmen."

=== Design ===
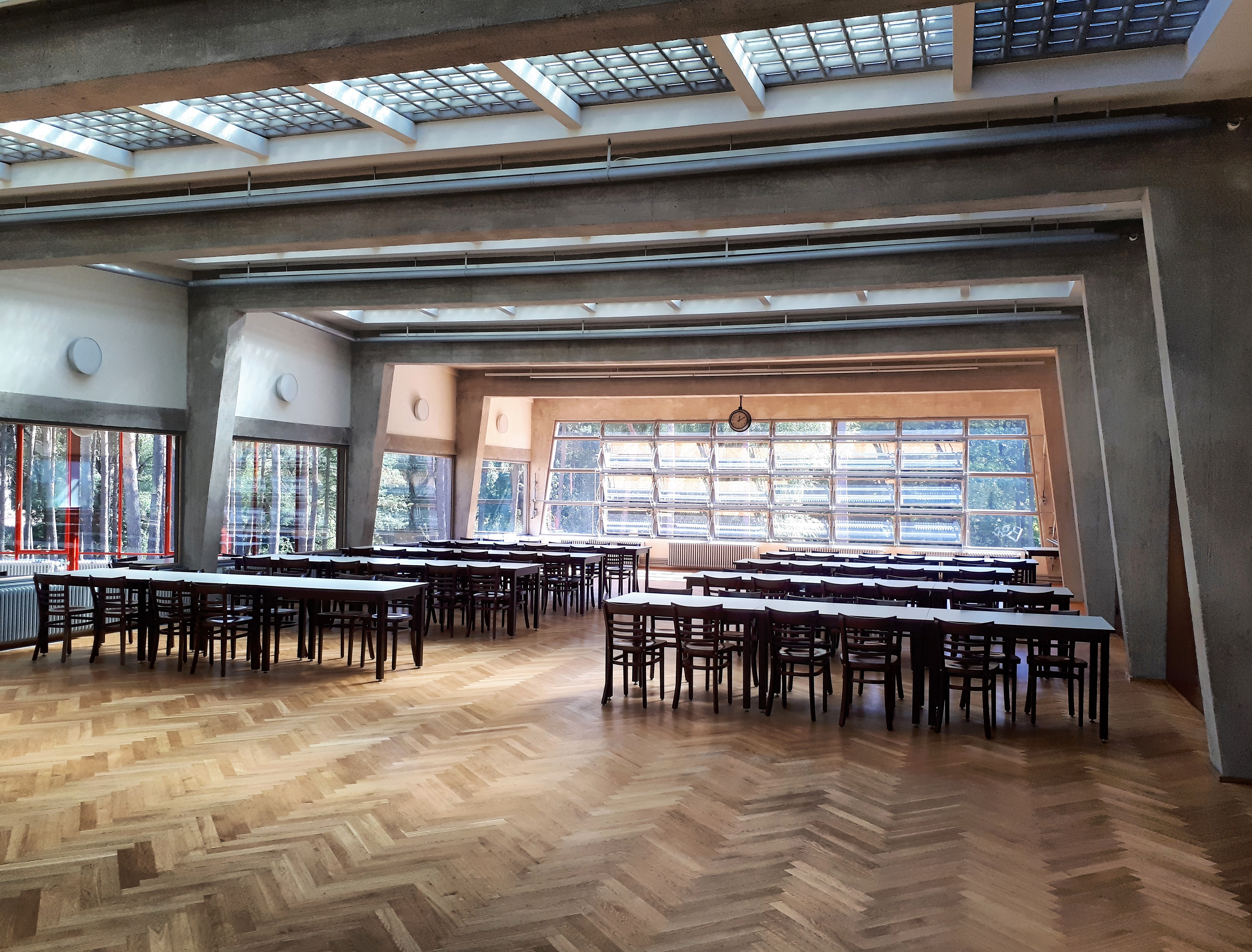
Dining room, ADGB Trade Union School

The complex was designed to fit harmoniously with the natural environment. The buildings are organised on the sloping, wooded site in a rational sequence, based on usage. The buildings are built in reinforced concrete, with load-bearing masonry block walls with yellow brick cladding.

Throughout the complex, the design of the windows, often large floor-to-ceiling in style which take advantage of the outdoor views, characterise the interiors, following on from the careful site analysis that was done as part of the design process. Unlike Walter Gropius’ Bauhaus Dessau building, which was designed entirely for visual and symbolic effect and could become a "sweatbox" in summer due to its large glass surfaces, the ADGB school was designed to avoid overheating by taking into account the sun's movement and changing angles.

The two-storey entrance building contains the foyer, auditorium, dining room, kitchen and administration area on the ground floor. There is a caretakers flat on the top floor. The appearance of the entrance was changed in the 1950s and these alterations were left in place in the 2003-2007 restoration.

A long, glazed corridor runs from the entrance building, linking five three-storey blocks, four of which house the trainees' halls of residence; the fifth provides communal space. At the end of the corridor is a two-storey building which has a gymnasium on the ground floor and seminar rooms above. The library is in a one-storey building in front of this.

The four residential blocks have distinct interior colour schemes, respectively blue, green, yellow and red. In each block the colours get lighter as the buildings get higher on each of the three floors. This was done to help navigation, as trainees were usually only there on short courses and didn't have much time to orientate themselves. The colours could also be used to group teams together for sports and other activities.

There are also four teachers' residences and two one-storey semi-detached houses. Paths around the complex were designed to encourage trainees and teachers to get to know each other as they walked between the living and teaching areas of the school.

The architectural historian Winfried Nerdinger described it as a "masterpiece of poetic functionalism".

== Interior furnishings ==
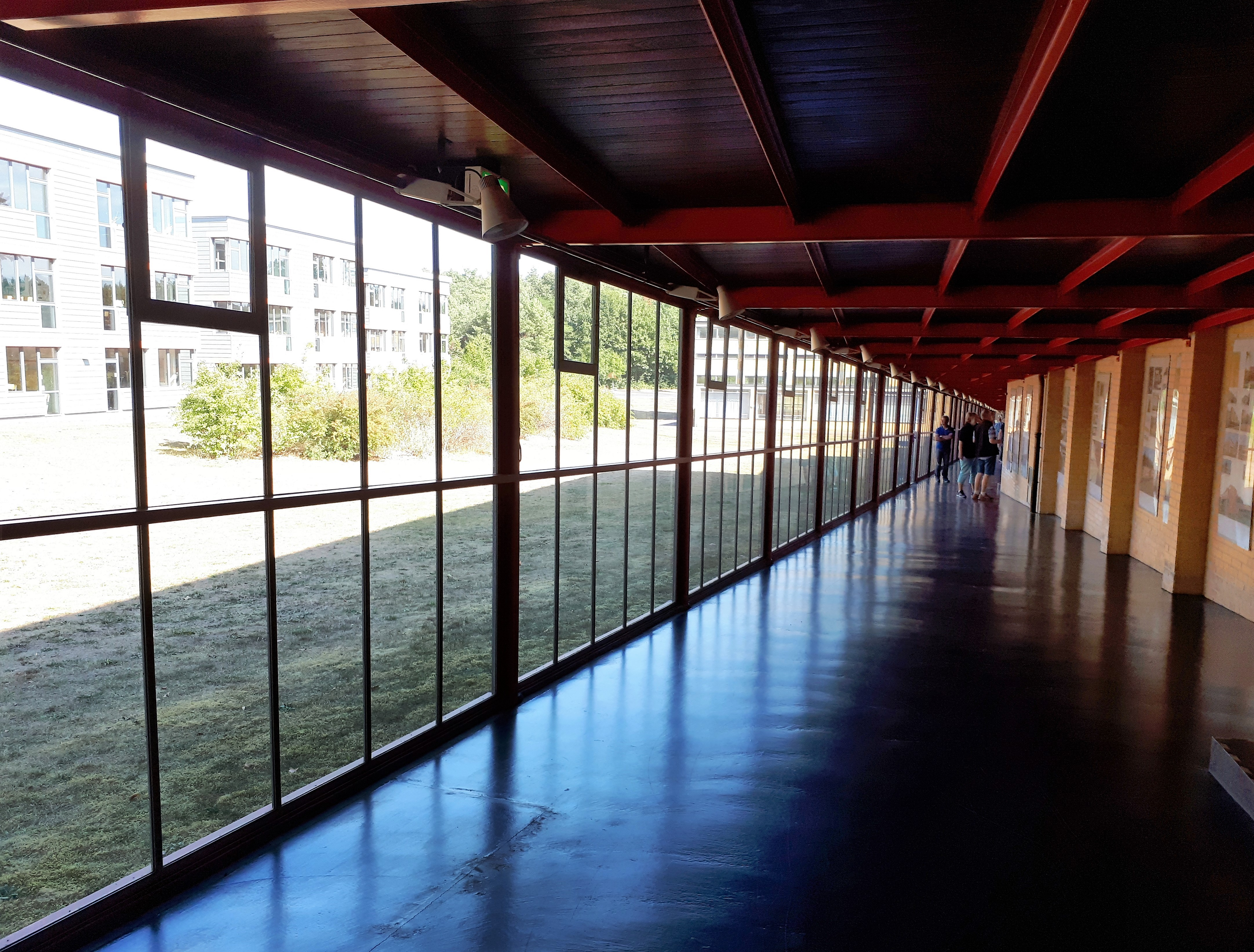
ADGB Trade Union School, glass corridor, 1928–1930

Meyer wanted to draw in skills and ideas from every Bauhaus workshop, not just the building theory course. Students involved in the interior design of the ADGB Trade Union School came from the weaving, carpentry and metalwork workshops, including:

Wera Meyer-Waldeck (1906 - 1964), who studied under Marcel Breuer in the carpentry workshop and later became an architect, designed most of the furniture for the project. This included simple but functional study desks.

Margaretha Reichardt (1907–1984), who studied in the weaving workshop and later set up her own weaving business, designed textiles which were used in the furnishings of the school.

== History ==
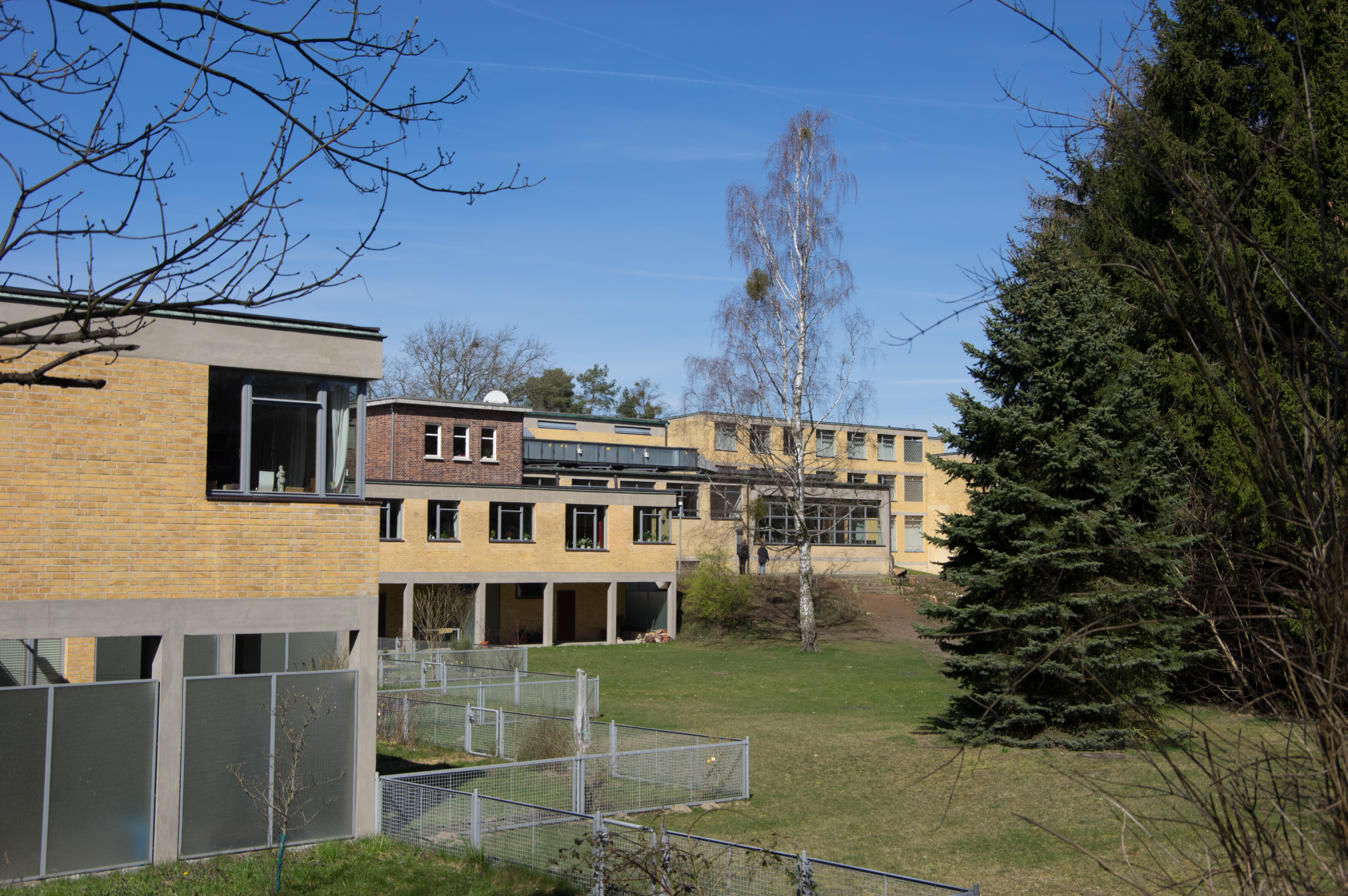
ADGB Trade Union School in 2016

The school opened on 4 May 1930. It could accommodate 120 trainees in twin rooms.

On 2 May 1933 the building was confiscated by the Nazis. Until the end of World War II it was used by the Reich Leadership School, for training leaders of the SS (Schutzstaffel), SD (Sicherheitsdienst) and Gestapo.

At the end of World War II, in spring 1945, the site was in the Soviet Occupation Zone. The Soviet Army used it as a temporary hospital and for military housing.

In spring 1946 the building was given to the Free German Trade Union Federation (FDGB), an East German organisation. During the Nazi period and the Russian occupation the school had been extensively damaged, so long term repair work began. In 1947 the school opened under the name FDGB-Bundesschule "Theodor Leipart" (Theodor Leipart FDGB Trade Union School). In January 1952 it was renamed again as the Gewerkschaftshochschule "Fritz Heckert" (Fritz Heckert Trade Union College).

In the early 1950s the architect Georg Waterstadt was contracted to build a second large building on the site to extend the FDGB school. This newer building sits parallel to the forest clearing and is clad in a darker brick than the Meyer/Wittwer complex. Waterstadt aimed to respect the original complex with his building which is also functionalist in style, and uses glass corridors. However, he also made major changes to the Meyer/Wittwer building itself, including changing the entrance building.

In 1977 the GDR government bestowed historic monument status on both the Meyer/Wittwer architecture and the Waterstadt building, although only the Meyer/Wittwer complex is part of the Bauhaus World Heritage site.

Prior to German reunification in October 1990, the FDGB was disestablished (May 1990). The school was closed in September 1990. The property of the former FDGB was initially managed by an asset management company which temporarily leased the complex to various organisations. From August 1991 it was leased long term to the State of Brandenburg for use as a school of public administration, which opened in January 1992 following renovation work.

In 1996 the state government took over the complex and it remained vacant for sometime. In 2001 the Handwerkskammer Berlin (Berlin Chamber of Skilled Crafts) sub-leased the main historic building of the complex, the Meyer-Wittwer-Bau (Meyer Wittwer Building) to use as a training centre. The centre, known in German as the Internat des Bildungszentrums der Handwerkskammer Berlin, has been in operation since 2007 when the major renovation project was completed.

== Restoration ==
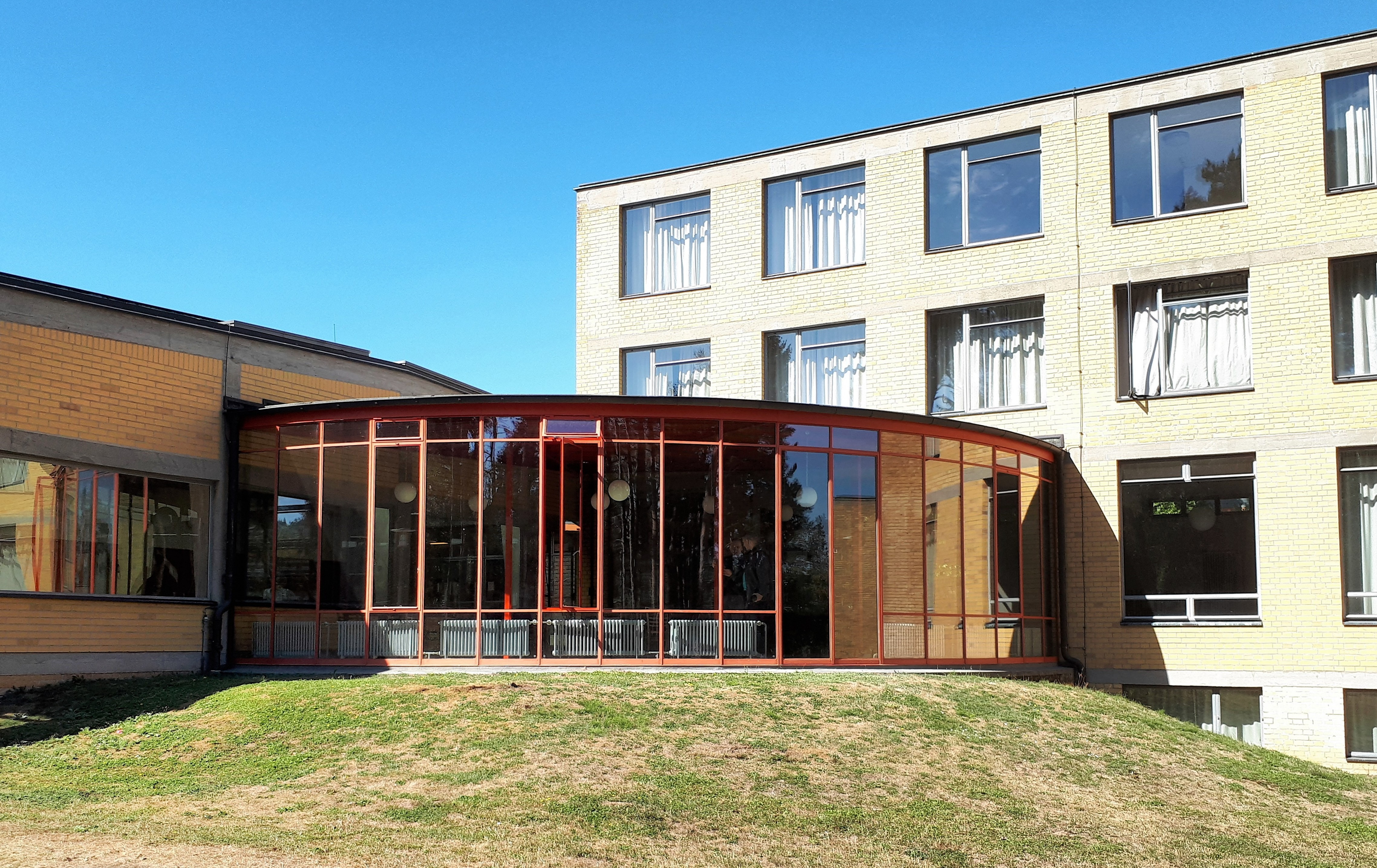
Rebuilt wintergarden pavilion extension to the dining room

In January 2001 the new lease holders, the Berlin Chamber of Skilled Crafts (Handwerkskammer Berlin), made a European-wide call for tenders for a redevelopment project, to restore Hannes Meyer's original architecture and to enable to building to be usable as a modern teaching facility. There were 102 responses with the contract awarded to Brenne Gesellschaft von Architekten in July 2001.

The first phase of construction was started in February 2003. In early 2005, the work in the foyer and the dormitories was completed. The second phase was completed 2007. The school building was almost completely restored to its original state, although the 1950s entrance has been retained.

In 2008 the architects, Brenne Gesellschaft von Architekten, won the World Monuments Fund / Knoll Modernism prize for the restoration. The prize is now given every two years, but this was the first time that it had been awarded.

In 2012 the ADGB Trade Union School was proposed to be included on the World Heritage List; it was inscribed as part of the WHS Bauhaus and its Sites in Weimar, Dessau and Bernau on 9 July 2017.

The Stiftung Baudenkmal Bundeschule Bernau (Foundation for the Preservation of the Trade Union School Landmark Bernau), was established in September 2011. Its main objective is "to continue researching the building complex ... as a cultural and historical landmark, and to raise public awareness".

The complex is not open to the general public, but the foundation runs tours, in German, of the interiors.

== See also ==
- Haus am Horn
- List of World Heritage Sites in Germany
