= Halina Konopacka =

Polish discus thrower (1900–1989)

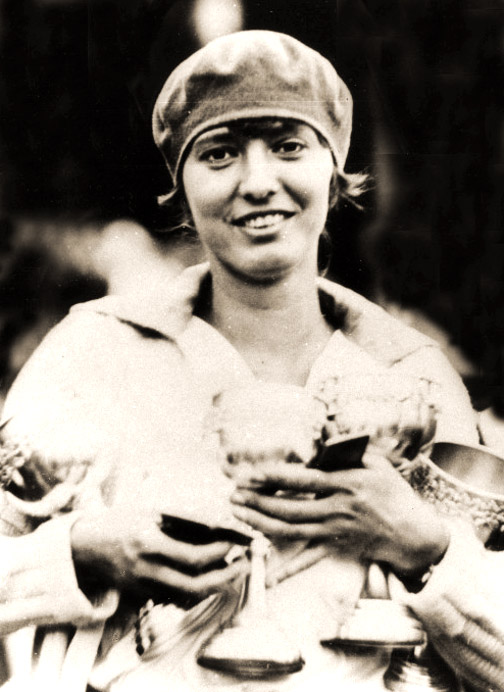
- Konopacka in 1928

Personal information
- Born: February 26, 1900 Rawa Mazowiecka, Congress Poland, Russian Empire
- Died: January 28, 1989 (aged 88) Daytona Beach, Florida, United States
- Education: Warsaw University
- Height: 180 cm (5 ft 11 in)
- Weight: 65 kg (143 lb)

Sport
- Sport: Athletics
- Events: Discus throw, javelin throw, shot put
- Club: AZS Warsaw

Achievements and titles
- Personal bests: DT – 39.62 m (1928); JT – 34.83 m (1930); SP – 9.96 m (1925)
Medal record
Representing Poland
Olympic Games
Gold medal – first place	1928 Amsterdam	Discus throw
Women's World Games
Gold medal – first place	1926 Gothenburg	Discus throw
Gold medal – first place	1930 Prague	Discus throw
Bronze medal – third place	1926 Gothenburg	Shot put

Halina Konopacka (full name Leonarda Kazimiera Konopacka-Matuszewska-Szczerbińska; 26 February 1900 – 28 January 1989) was a Polish athlete. She won the discus throw event at the 1928 Summer Olympics, defeating American silver medal winner Lillian Copeland, breaking her own world record, and becoming the first Polish Olympic champion. After retiring from athletics she became a writer and poet. She immigrated to the United States after World War II, and died there.

== Biography ==
Konopacka was born in Rawa Mazowiecka, Congress Poland, and grew up in Warsaw, where she trained in horse riding, swimming, and skating. Her whole family also played tennis, including her father Jakub, sister Czesława, and brother Tadeusz. While studying at the Faculty of Philology of the Warsaw University she also took up skiing and athletics, but soon abandoned winter sports because the training facilities were too far from her home. In 1926, after only a few months of training, she set her first world record in the discus throw, which was then followed by two more records in 1927 and 1928.

Konopacka had dark skin and brown eyes, owing to her Tatar ancestors on her maternal side. She always wore a red beret while competing, and was nicknamed "Miss Olympia". In 1928 she married Ignacy Matuszewski, who was soon to become the Minister of the Treasury, in which function he served in five consecutive governments of Poland. She retired from athletics in 1931 but continued to do sports recreationally, including skiing, tennis and car racing. She continued to be listed as one of the best Polish tennis players up until 1937. She was a guest of honor at both the 1936 Winter as well as Summer Olympics, and in 1938–1939 also a member of the Polish Olympic Committee. Being a well-educated woman, fluent in three foreign languages, she engaged in writing poetry. She wrote her first volume of poems titled Któregoś dnia (Some Day) in 1929, and later published her verses in the literary magazine of the Skamander group as well as in the Wiadomości Literackie, the premier literary periodical of the interbellum Poland, earning recognition among established writers of the day such as Mieczysław Grydzewski, Kazimierz Wierzyński and Antoni Słonimski. According to professor Anna Nasiłowska, Konopacka's works were valued for their feminist approach to analyzing the relationship between a man and a woman, and for their reminiscences of youth and the treatment of the topic of jealousy.

The grave of Halina Konopacka at the Bródno Cemetery of Warsaw

In September 1939, at the onset of World War II, she helped her husband, Ignacy Matuszewski, the former Minister of the Treasury in the Polish Government, evacuate the gold reserves of the Polish National Bank to France to help finance the Polish government-in-exile. After France surrendered to Germany in June 1940, the couple immigrated to the United States, arriving there through Spain, Portugal and Brazil in September 1941. After her husband died suddenly in New York in 1946, she founded a skiing school near New York City, as well as tried her hand at fashion design and ran a boutique shop there. In 1949, she married George Szczerbiński, an accomplished tennis player. After her second husband's death in 1959, she moved to Florida, where in 1960 she graduated from an art college at which point she became a painter, working under the alias of Helen George. She painted mostly flowers. She died on 28 January 1989, and soon thereafter was awarded posthumously the Silver Cross of Merit by the Polish Government. Her ashes were laid to rest in her parents' grave at the Bródno Cemetery of Warsaw.

Also posthumously, on 11 November 2018, she was awarded the Order of the White Eagle, the highest order of merit of the Republic of Poland.

== Works ==
- Któregoś dnia, Warszawa : Heliodor, 2008. ISBN 9788360854242, OCLC 297820845
- Halina Konopacka; Maria Rotkiewicz, Wznosiłam świat miłością, Warszawa : Spółka Wydawnicza Heliodor, 1994, ISBN 9788386338023, OCLC 749660642

== Bibliography ==
- Karol Wiktor Zawodziński, "Poezje Konopackiej" (The Verses of Konopacka); in id., Wśród poetów, Kraków, Wydawnictwo Literackie, 1964, pages 306–308, and passim.

Records
Preceded by (Czechoslovakia) Marie Vidláková	Women's discus world record holder 23 May 1926 – 22 August 1926	Succeeded by (Germany) Milly Reuter
Preceded by (Germany) Milly Reuter	Women's discus world record holder 4 September 1927 – 15 May 1932	Succeeded by (Poland) Jadwiga Wajs
