= Elfrīda Karlsone =

Latvian discus thrower

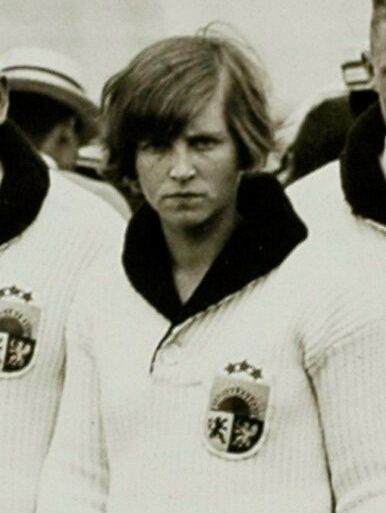
- Elfrīda Karlsone in 1928

Personal information
- Full name: Elfrīda Karlsone-Kukaine-Bērziņa
- Nationality: Latvian
- Born: 18 April 1904 Riga
- Died: 4 June 1983 (aged 79) London, Ontario, Canada

Sport
- Sport: Athletics
- Event: Discus throw

Elfrīda Karlsone (18 April 1904 – 4 June 1983) was a Latvian athlete. She competed in the women's discus throw at the 1928 Summer Olympics.
