= Genowefa Kobielska =

Polish discus thrower and shot putter

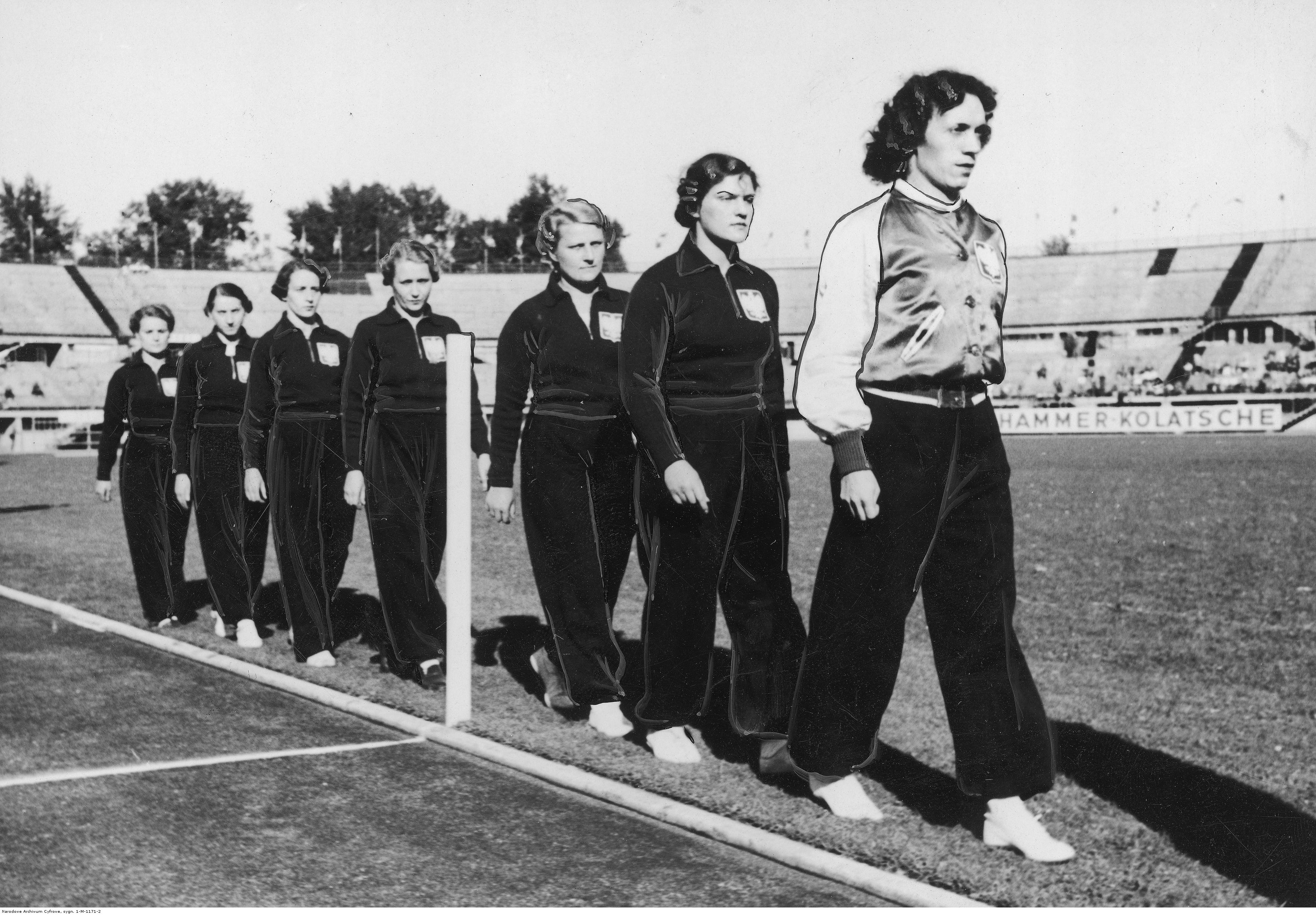
Genowefa Kobielska (3. from right), 1938 European Championships

Genowefa Kobielska (later Cejzikowa, later Zimnochova, April 24, 1906 – July 16, 1993) was a Polish track and field athlete who competed in the 1928 Summer Olympics.

She was born in Łask and died in Piaseczno. She was the wife of Antoni Cejzik.

In 1928 she finished eighth in the qualification of the discus throw event.

She also competed in the 1938 European Championships in Athletics held in Vienna and finished fifth in the discus throw competition and seventh in the shot put contest.
