= Berta Jikeli =

Romanian discus thrower

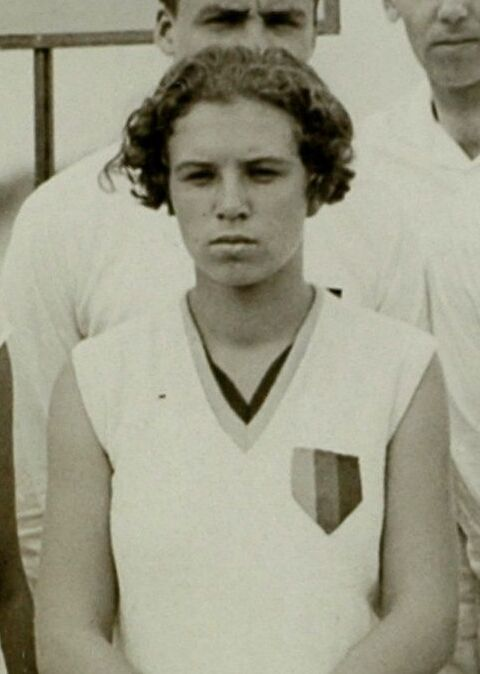
- Berta Jikeli in 1928

Personal information
- Nationality: Romanian
- Born: 19 April 1911 Nagyszeben, Austria-Hungary
- Died: 7 October 2000 (aged 89) Heilbronn, Germany

Sport
- Sport: Athletics
- Event: Discus throw

Berta Jikeli (19 April 1911 – 7 October 2000) was a Romanian athlete. She competed in the women's discus throw at the 1928 Summer Olympics. She was the first woman to represent Romania at the Olympics.
