= Milly Reuter =

German discus thrower

Mathilde ("Milly") Emilie Reuter (1 October 1904 in Rödelheim - 30 April 1976 in Frankfurt am Main) was a German track and field athlete who competed in the 1928 Summer Olympics.

In 1928 she finished fourth in the discus throw event.

Records
Preceded by (Poland) Halina Konopacka	Women's Discus World Record Holder; 22 August 1926 – 4 September 1927	Succeeded by (Poland) Halina Konopacka
