= Pierina Borsani =

Italian athlete

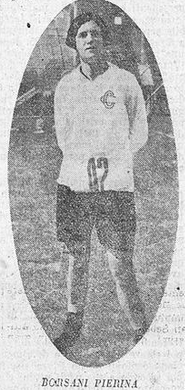

Personal information
- Nationality: Italian
- Born: 3 October 1909 Castellanza
- Died: 26 September 1960 (aged 50)

Sport
- Country: Italy
- Sport: Athletics; Basketball
- Event(s): Discus throw Javelin throw Shot put Pentathlon

Piera, better known Pierina Borsani (3 October 1909 – 26 September 1960) was an Italian basketball player and athlete who competed at the 1928 Summer Olympics in discus throw.

== National titles ==
She won eight national championships at individual senior level.

- Italian Athletics Championships
  - Shot put: 1927
  - Discus throw: 1927, 1931
  - Javelin throw: 1927, 1929, 1934, 1935
  - Pentathlon: 1934
