= Lena Michaëlis =

Dutch discus thrower

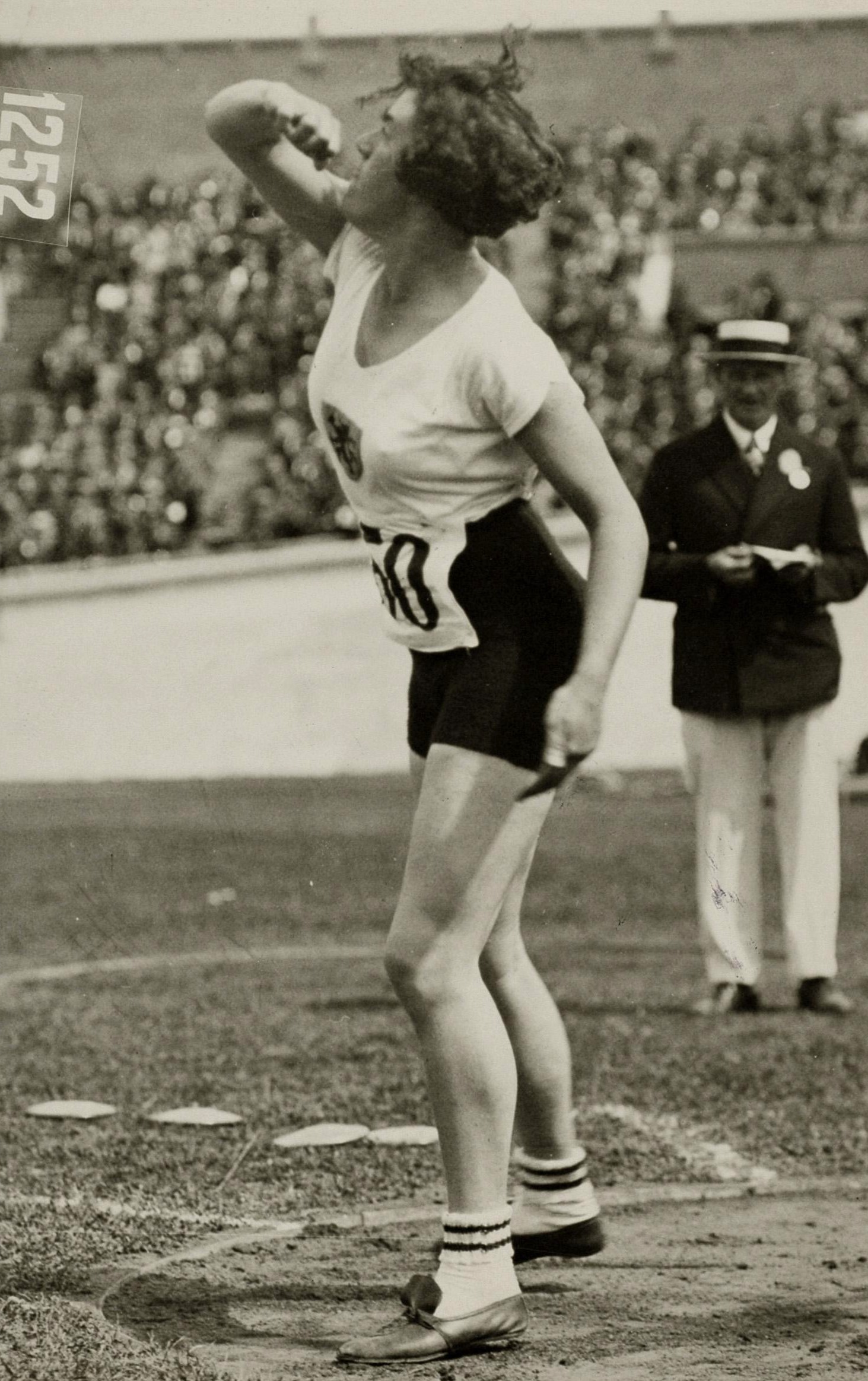
- Lena Michaëlis at the 1928 Olympics

Personal information
- Full name: Helena Cornelia Michaëlis
- Born: 4 November 1905 The Hague, Netherlands
- Died: 15 June 1982 (aged 76) The Hague, Netherlands

Sport
- Sport: Discus throw; javelin throw
- Club: Te Werve, Rijswijk

Helena Cornelia "Lena" Michaëlis (4 November 1905 – 15 June 1982) was a Dutch discus thrower. She competed at the 1928 Summer Olympics, and finished 11th with a throw of 31,04 m. Next, she held the official Dutch record of 30,15.

== Sports career ==
Lena Michaëlis was a member of the athletics association Te Werve. Michaëlis became Dutch discus throwing champion in 1928 with a throw of 31,43 m. It must have been the main reason why she was selected to participate in the Olympic Games in Amsterdam. Here she finished 7th in the discus in the first run (11th overall) with a distance of 31,04, with which she was excluded from further participation. It is unclear why neither performance has been marked as a Dutch record, as that stood at 23,84 and had been held by Martha Kolthof since 1927.

The performance that Lena Michaëlis delivered shortly after the Games in Gouda was recognized as a Dutch record: on 26 August 1928, she threw to a distance of 30,15. This record held for a year, when Dora Wevers improved it on 1 September.

== Personal ==
In August 1938, still 32-years old, she divorced Hendrik Kleyweg.
