= Bernau bei Berlin =

- Town
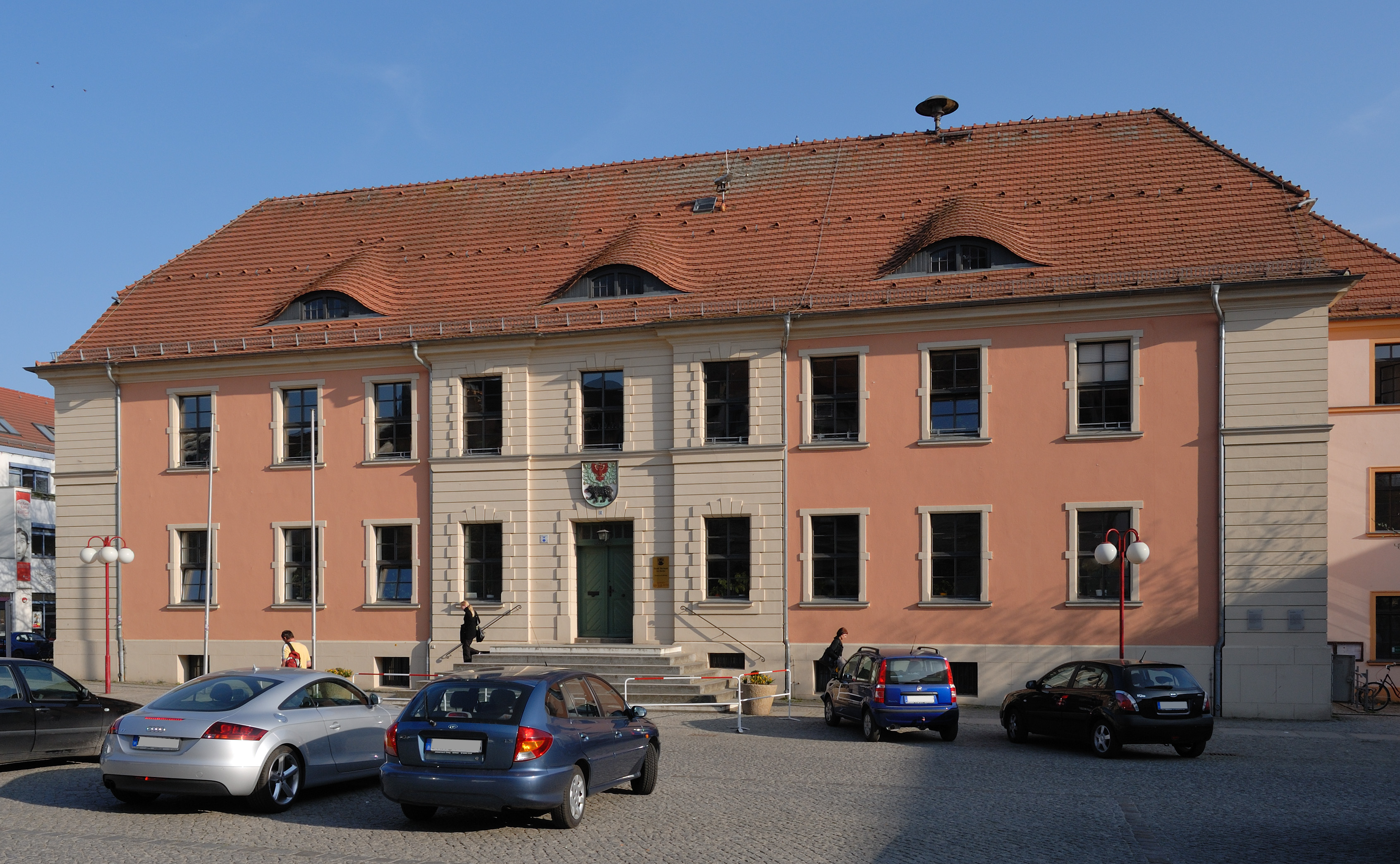
- Town hall

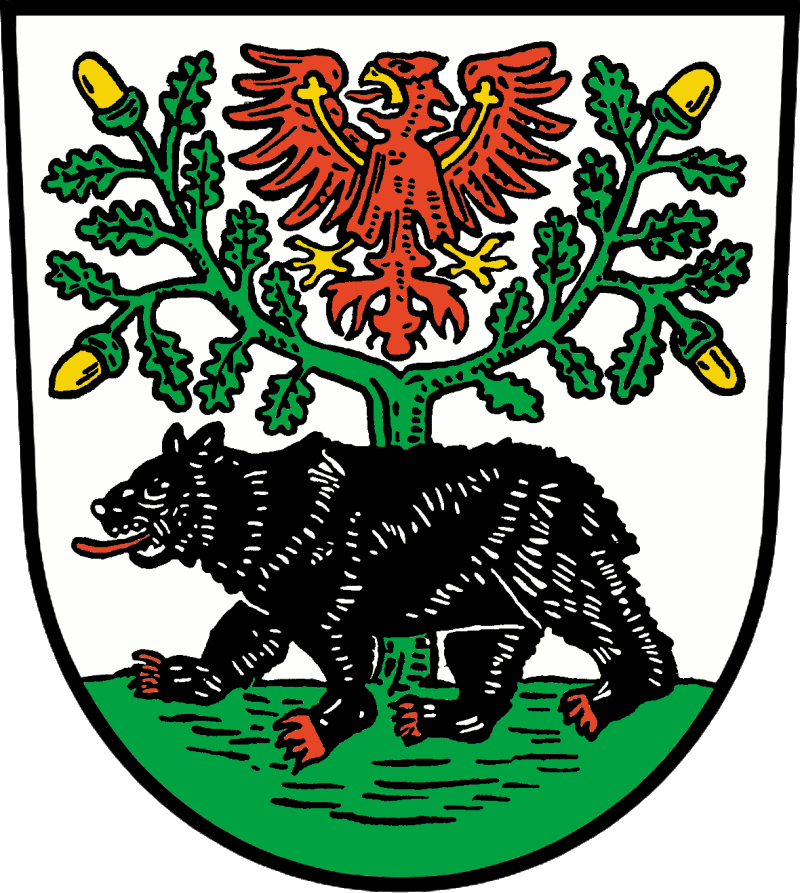
- Coat of arms

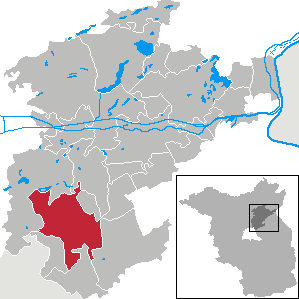
- Location of Bernau bei Berlin within Barnim district
- Interactive map of Bernau bei Berlin
- Location within Germany Location within Brandenburg
- Coordinates: 52°40′45″N 13°35′15″E
- Country: Germany
- State: Brandenburg
- District: Barnim
- Subdivisions: Hauptort und 4 Ortsteile

Government
  - Mayor (2022–30): André Stahl (Left)

Area
  - Total: 104.17 km^{2} (40.22 sq mi)
- Elevation: 68 m (223 ft)

Population (2025-12-31)
  - Total: 44,706
  - Density: 429.16/km^{2} (1,111.5/sq mi)
- Time zone: UTC+01:00 (CET)
  - Summer (DST): UTC+02:00 (CEST)
- Postal codes: 16321
- Dialling codes: 03338
- Vehicle registration: BAR, BER, EW
- Website: www.bernau-bei-berlin.de

Bernau bei Berlin (German pronunciation: [bɛʁˈnaʊ baɪ bɛʁˈliːn], lit. 'Bernau near Berlin'; commonly named Bernau) is a town in the Barnim district in Brandenburg in eastern Germany, located about 10 km (6.2 mi) northeast of Berlin.

== History ==
Bärnau

Archaeological excavations of Mesolithic-era sites indicate that the area has been inhabited since about 8800 BC. The city was first mentioned in 1232. It was historically spelled "Bärnau" [ˈbɛʁnaʊ̯] and since changed to Bernau [ˈbɛrnaʊ̯]. The reasons for its founding are not known. According to legend, Albert I of Brandenburg permitted the founding of the city in 1140 because of the good beer which was offered to him.

Bernau underwent an economic boom before the Thirty Years' War. Large parts of the defensive wall with town gate and wet moats were built during that period. These helped Bernau defend itself successfully against attackers, including the Hussites in 1432. However, conditions declined after the war and the plague. Frederick I of Prussia settled 25 Huguenot families, comprising craftsmen, farmers, traders, and scientists, in the town in 1699.

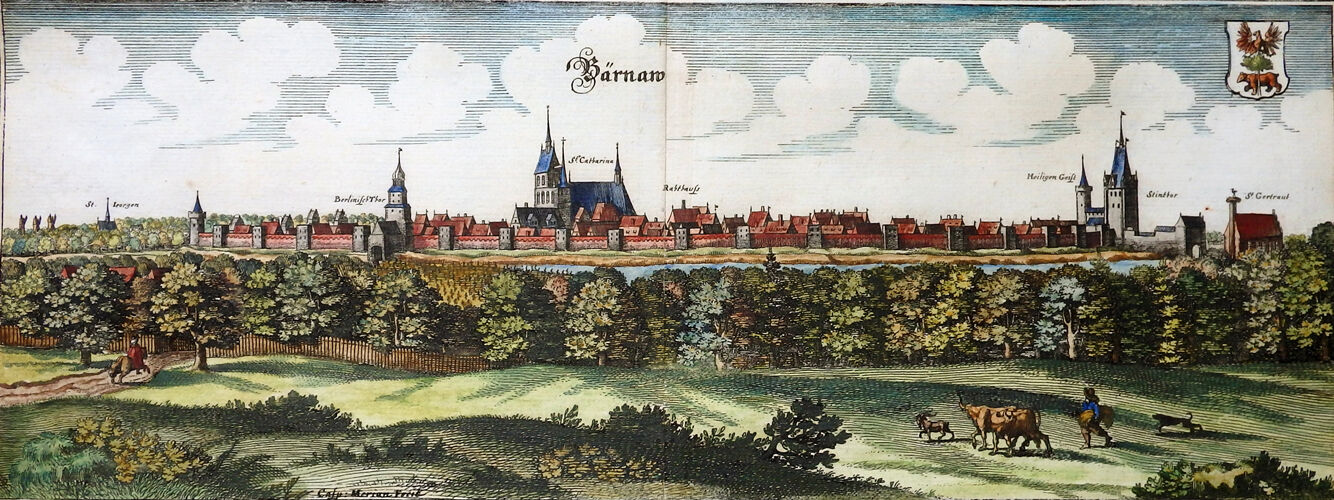
Historic Image of Bernau in ~ 1650

From the 18th century, Bernau was part of the Kingdom of Prussia, and from 1815 to 1947, it was administratively located in the Province of Brandenburg.

During World War II, in 1943–1945, it was the location of a subcamp of the Sachsenhausen concentration camp. In early 1945, a death march of prisoners of various nationalities from the dissolved camp in Żabikowo to Sachsenhausen passed through the town.

From 1947 to 1952 it was part of the State of Brandenburg in East Germany, from 1952 to 1990 of the East German Bezirk Frankfurt and since 1990 again in Brandenburg in modern Germany. In 1842 a railway line was opened. One of the first electrical suburban railway lines in the world began operation in 1924. A line of the Berlin S-Bahn connected Bernau with the Stettiner Bahnhof (today Berlin Nordbahnhof) in Berlin. The ADGB Trade Union School (Bundesschule des Allgemeinen Deutschen Gewerkschaftsbundes), designed by Bauhaus director Hannes Meyer, opened in 1930. It was included as part of the World Heritage Site the Bauhaus and its Sites in Weimar, Dessau and Bernau in July 2017.

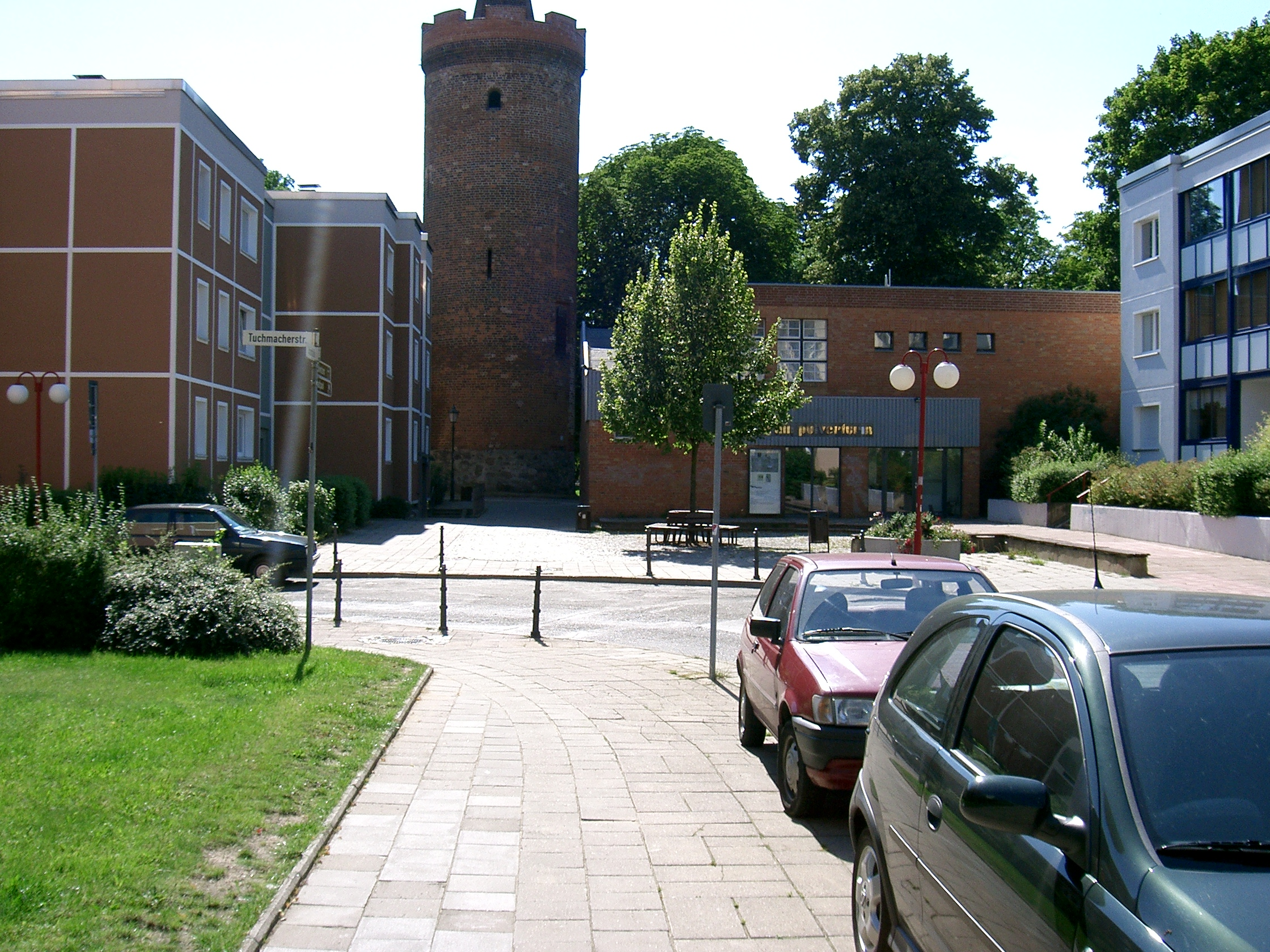
Pulverturm (Armory).

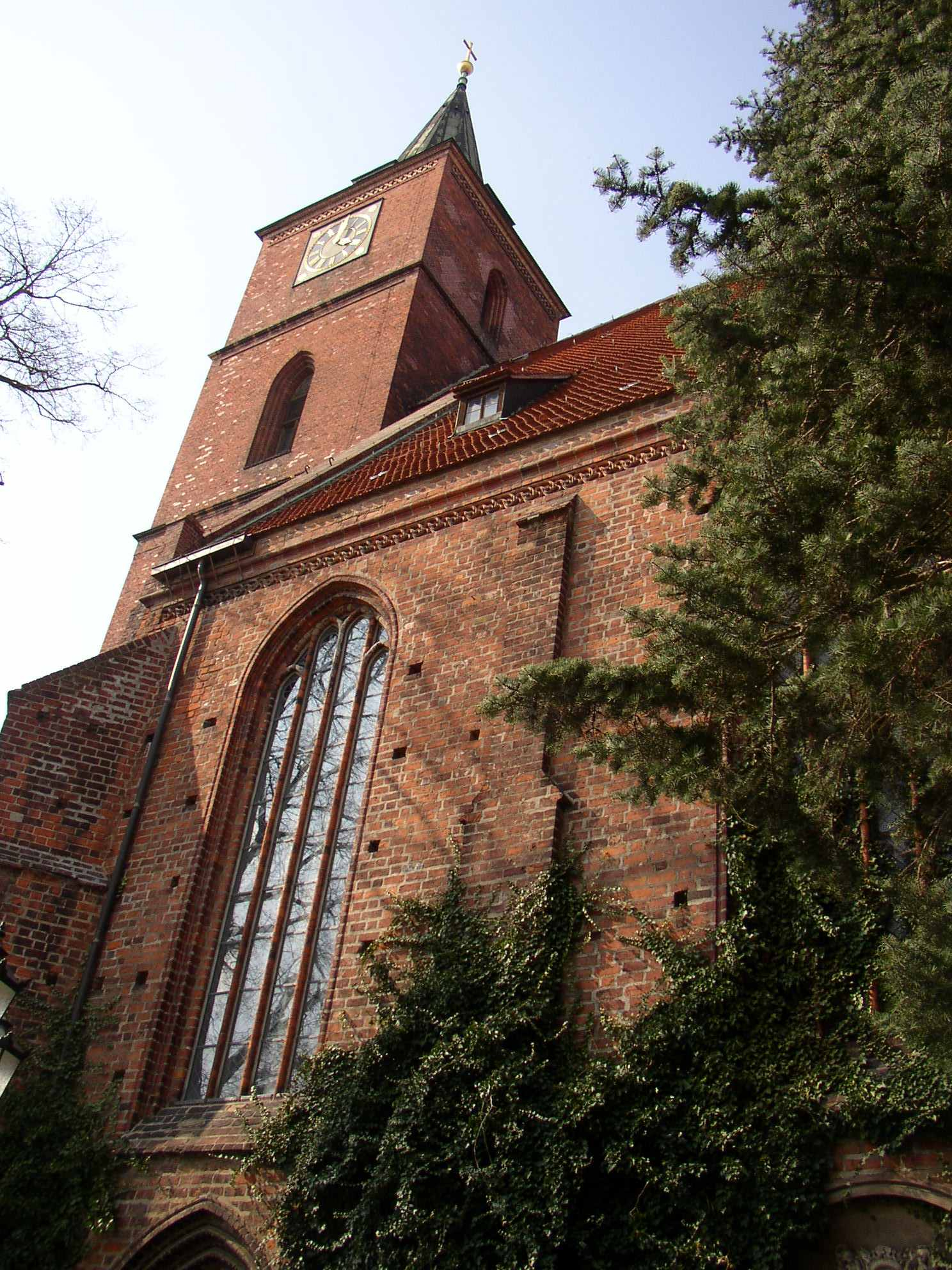
Church of St. Mary.

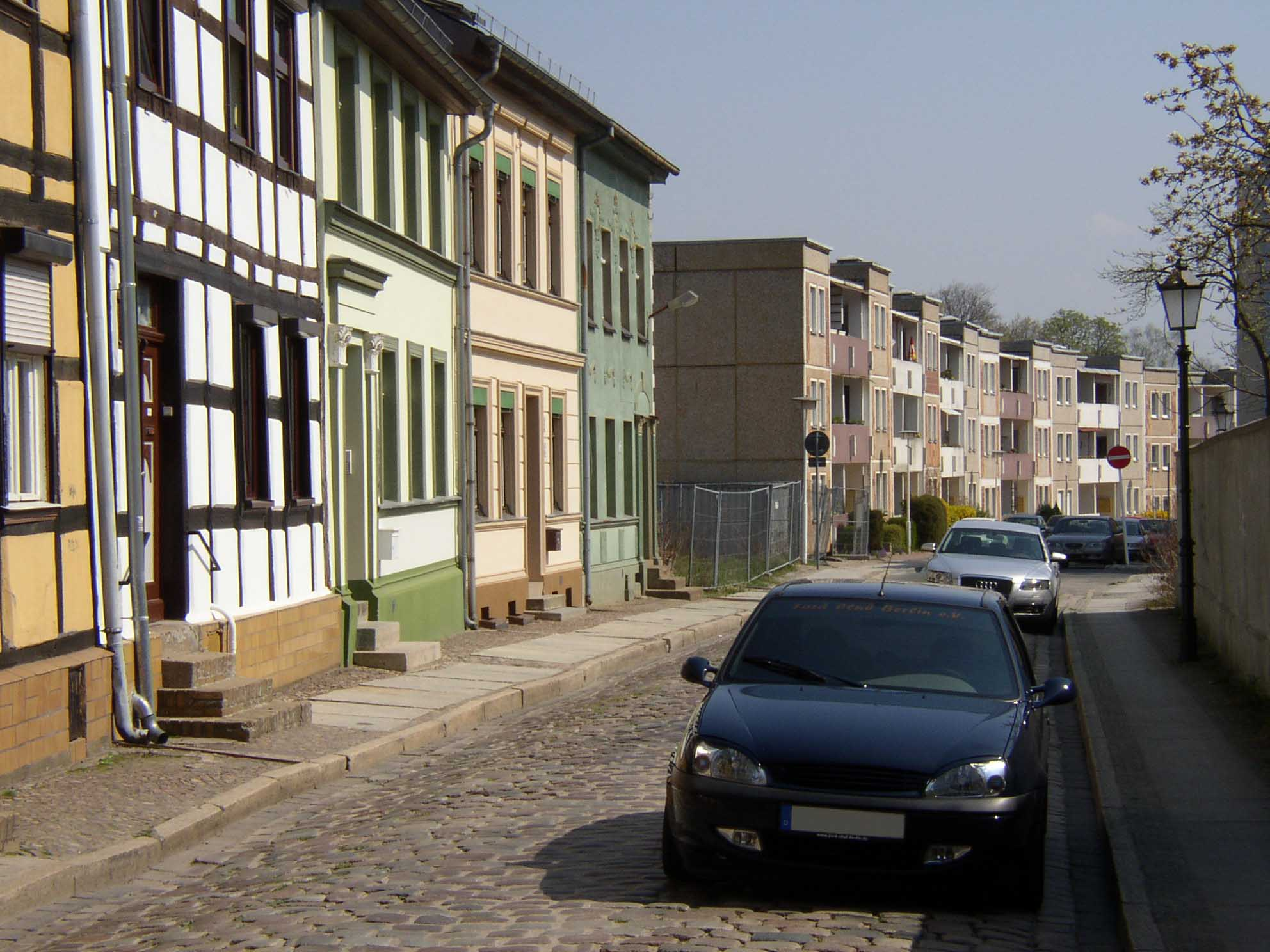
Timber-framed houses and Plattenbauten.

== Demography ==
Development of Population since 1875 within the Current Boundaries (Blue Line: Population; Dotted Line: Comparison to Population Development of Brandenburg state; Grey Background: Time of Nazi rule; Red Background: Time of Communist rule)

Recent Population Development and Projections (Population Development before Census 2011 (blue line); Recent Population Development according to the Census in Germany in 2011 (blue bordered line); Official projections for 2005-2030 (yellow line); for 2014-2030 (red line); for 2017-2030 (scarlet line)

Bernau bei Berlin: Population development
within the current boundaries (2017)

Year	Pop.	±% p.a.
1875	8,060	—
1890	9,583	+1.16%
1910	12,364	+1.28%
1925	13,403	+0.54%
1933	17,671	+3.52%
1939	20,256	+2.30%
1946	19,678	−0.41%
1950	20,482	+1.01%
1964	20,545	+0.02%
1971	20,511	−0.02%
1981	24,318	+1.72%
1985	25,386	+1.08%
1989	25,145	−0.24%
1990	24,532	−2.44%
1991	24,491	−0.17%

Year	Pop.	±% p.a.
1992	24,693	+0.82%
1993	24,744	+0.21%
1994	24,913	+0.68%
1995	25,428	+2.07%
1996	27,208	+7.00%
1997	29,609	+8.82%
1998	31,231	+5.48%
1999	32,506	+4.08%
2000	33,086	+1.78%
2001	33,507	+1.27%
2002	33,882	+1.12%
2003	34,379	+1.47%
2004	34,995	+1.79%
2005	35,235	+0.69%
2006	35,546	+0.88%

Year	Pop.	±% p.a.
2007	35,859	+0.88%
2008	36,059	+0.56%
2009	36,154	+0.26%
2010	36,338	+0.51%
2011	35,843	−1.36%
2012	36,020	+0.49%
2013	36,222	+0.56%
2014	36,547	+0.90%
2015	37,169	+1.70%
2016	37,725	+1.50%
2017	38,194	+1.24%
2018	38,825	+1.65%
2019	40,031	+3.11%
2020	40,908	+2.19%

== Local Divisions ==
The Town has the following local divisions:

- Birkenhöhe (since 2014)
- Birkholz (incorporated in 1993, district since 2014)
- Birkholzaue (since 2014)
- Börnicke (since 2002)
- Ladeburg (since 2001)
- Lobetal (since 2002)
- Schönow (since 2003)
- Waldfrieden (since 2016)

Several small local settlements are also part of the city:

- Bernau Süd
- Blumenhag
- Eichwerder
- Friedenstal
- Gieses Plan
- Helenenau
- Kirschgarten
- Liepnitz
- Lindow
- Neubauernsiedlung
- Nibelungen
- Puschkinviertel
- Rehberge
- Rollberg
- Rutenfeld
- Schmetzdorf
- Stadtkern
- Thaerfelde
- Viehtrift
- Waldsiedlung
- Woltersdorf

== Main sights ==
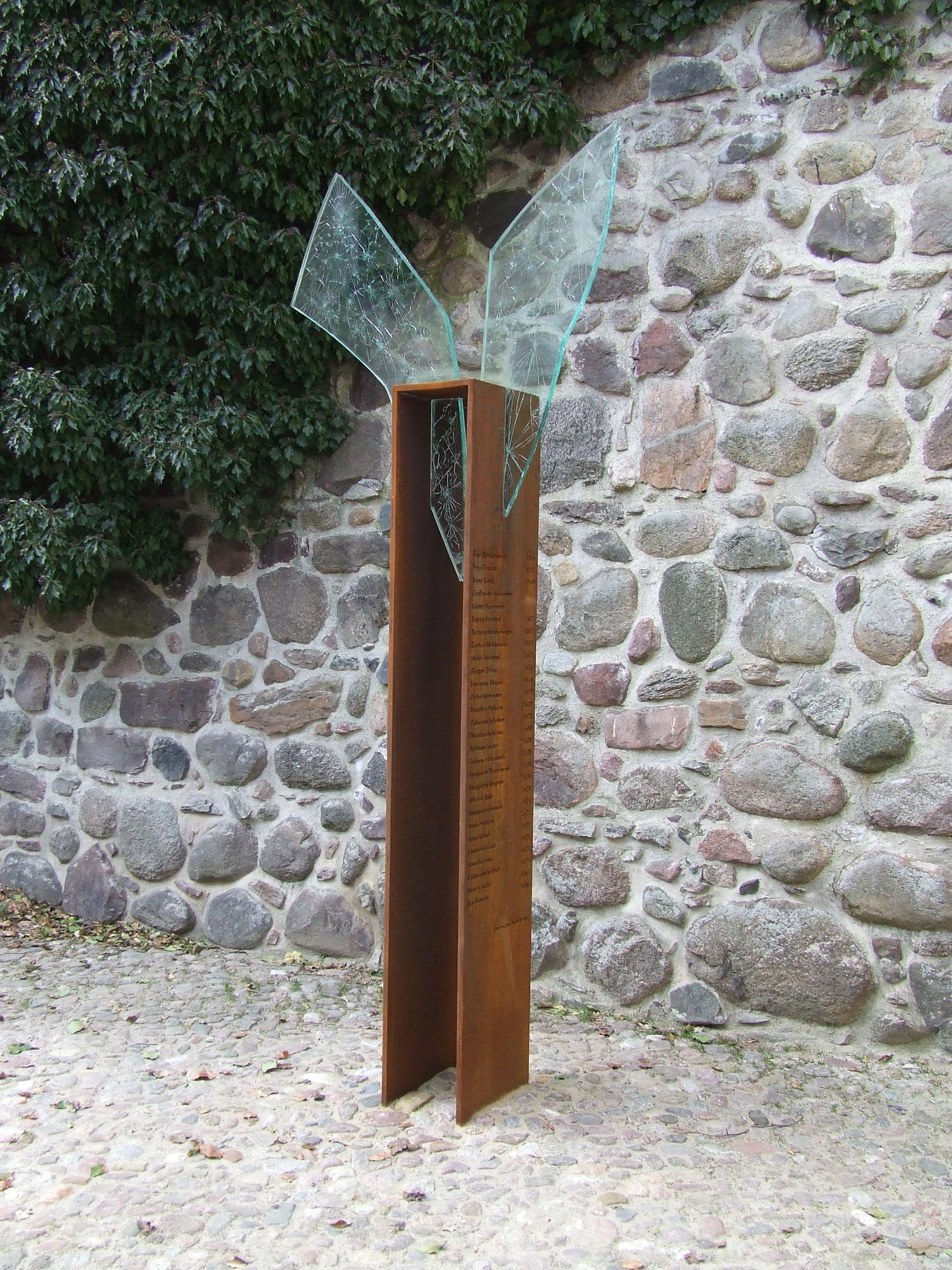
Monument for the victims of witch-hunt in Bernau

=== Museums ===
The museum of local history has two locations. One is the town gate with the former prison Hungerturm (Tower of Hunger). It is one of formerly three town gates, that were part of the defensive wall. Today, armour and instruments of torture of the Middle Ages are shown there. Common furniture from several epochs, and utensils of the executioner are exhibited in the Henkerhaus (executioner's house) to demonstrate life in the small town.

In 2005, the Wolf Kahlen Museum opened. Media art from over 40 years is shown there.

In 2005, Annelie Grund created a monument for the victims of a witch hunt.

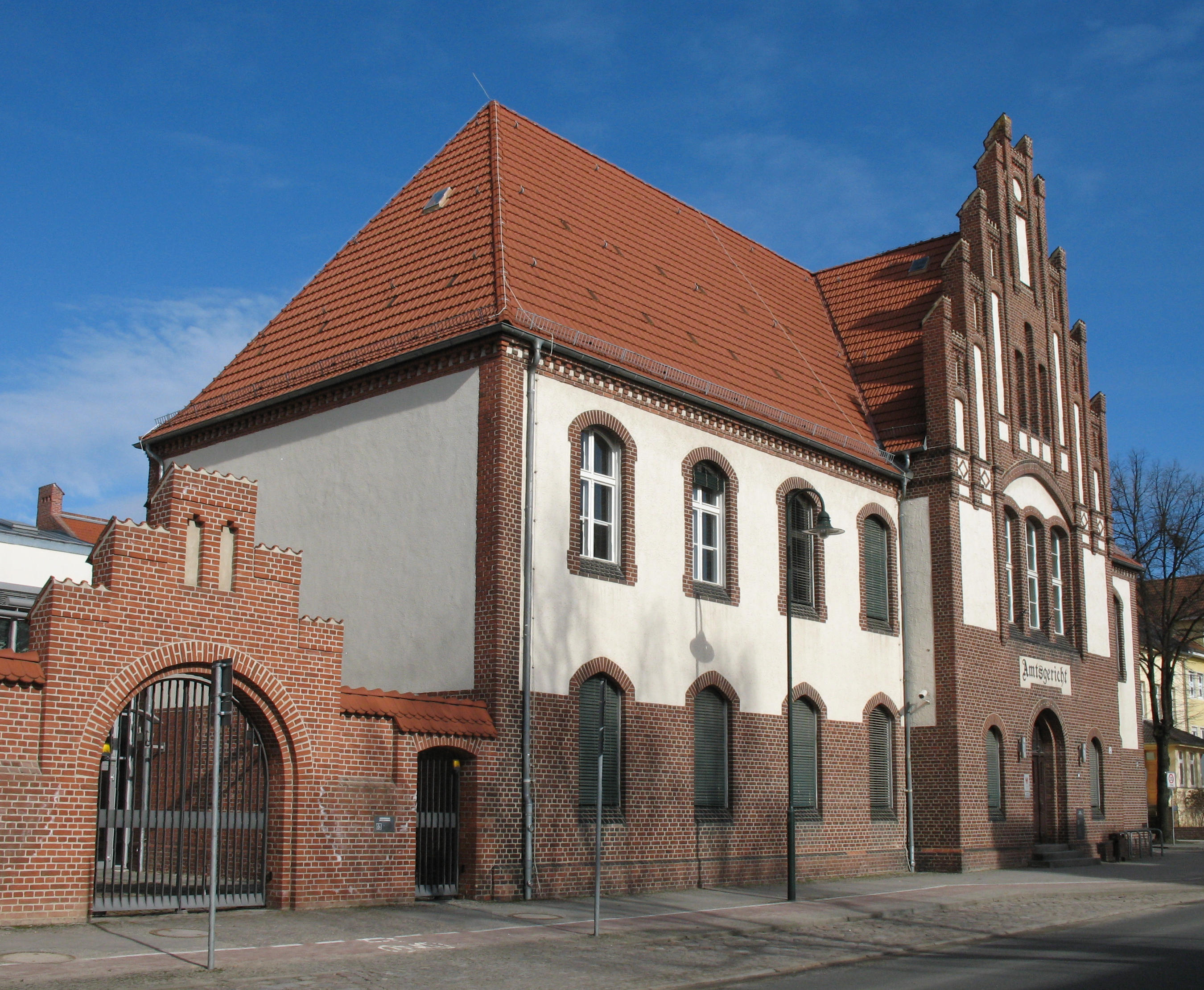
Local District Court

=== Buildings ===
The church of St. Marien in the Late Gothic style dominates the skyline of the town. The nave was built in the 15th century.

Large parts of the defensive walls and wet moats of the Middle Ages are preserved. The defensive wall is supplemented by several lookout houses, the Pulverturm (armoury) and a town gate.

Until the 1960s, the city centre, enclosed by the defensive wall, consisted of small old buildings with timber framed construction. Most of them were disrepair because no funds were available in East Germany to renovate them. It was decided to change Bernau into an exemplary city of socialist architecture. Nearly all the old houses were torn down in the 1960s and 1970s and new Plattenbauten (buildings constructed of prefabricated concrete slabs) were built. The new houses had a maximum of four storeys to fit in with the historical architecture of the city.

The former ADGB school is located in the northeast of the town. It is the largest building in the Bauhaus style besides the Bauhaus itself.

Breitscheidstraße

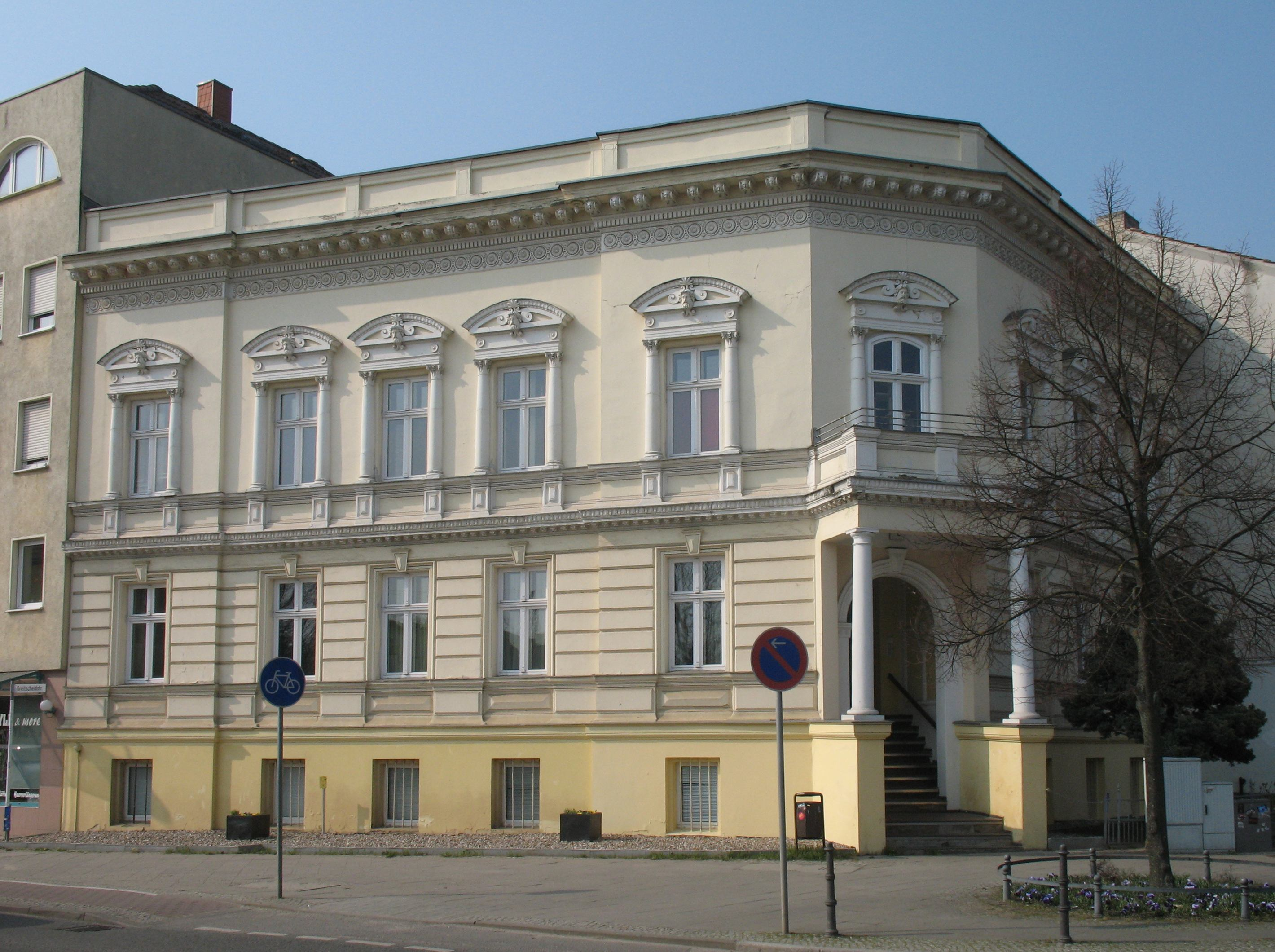

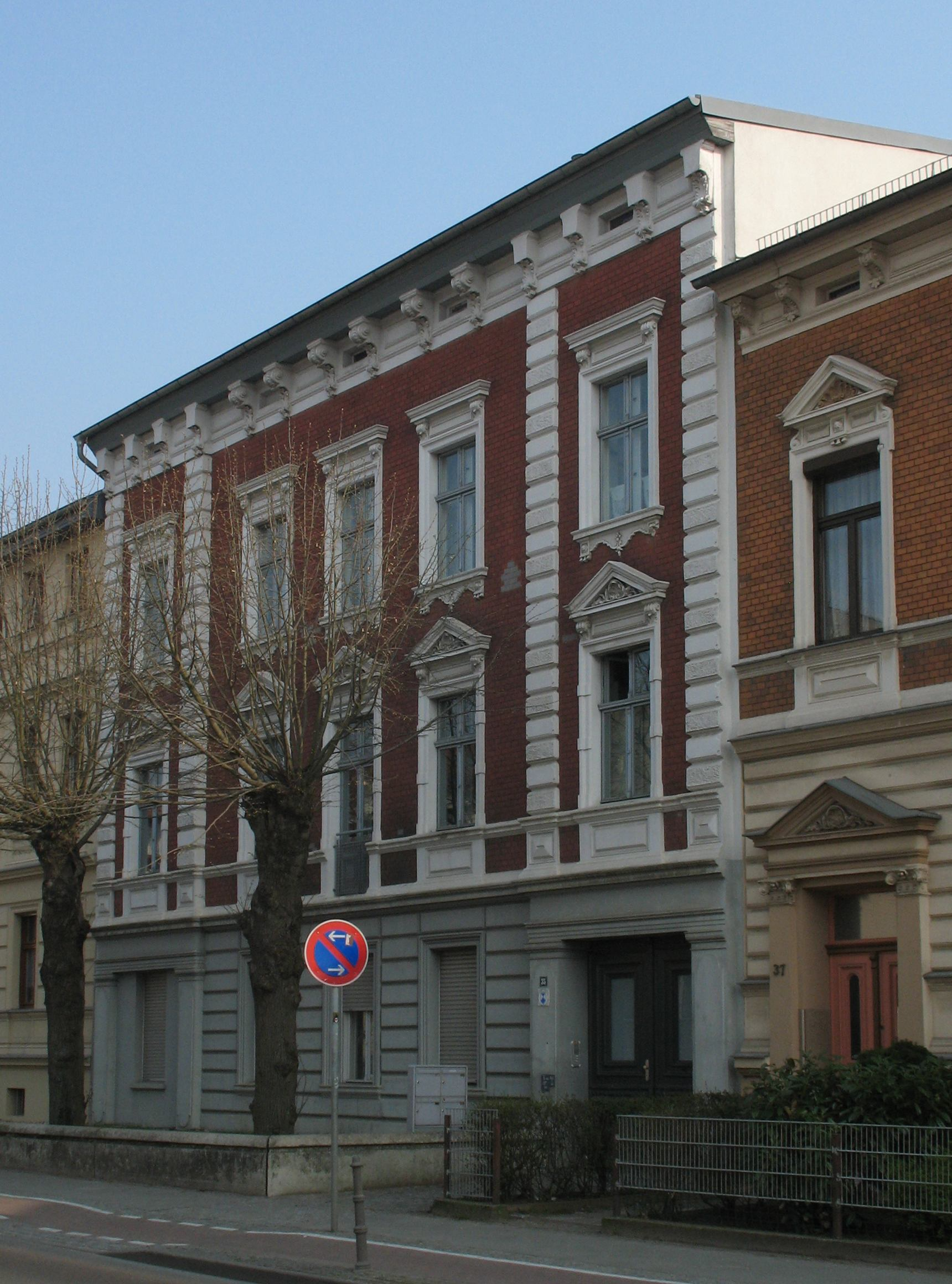

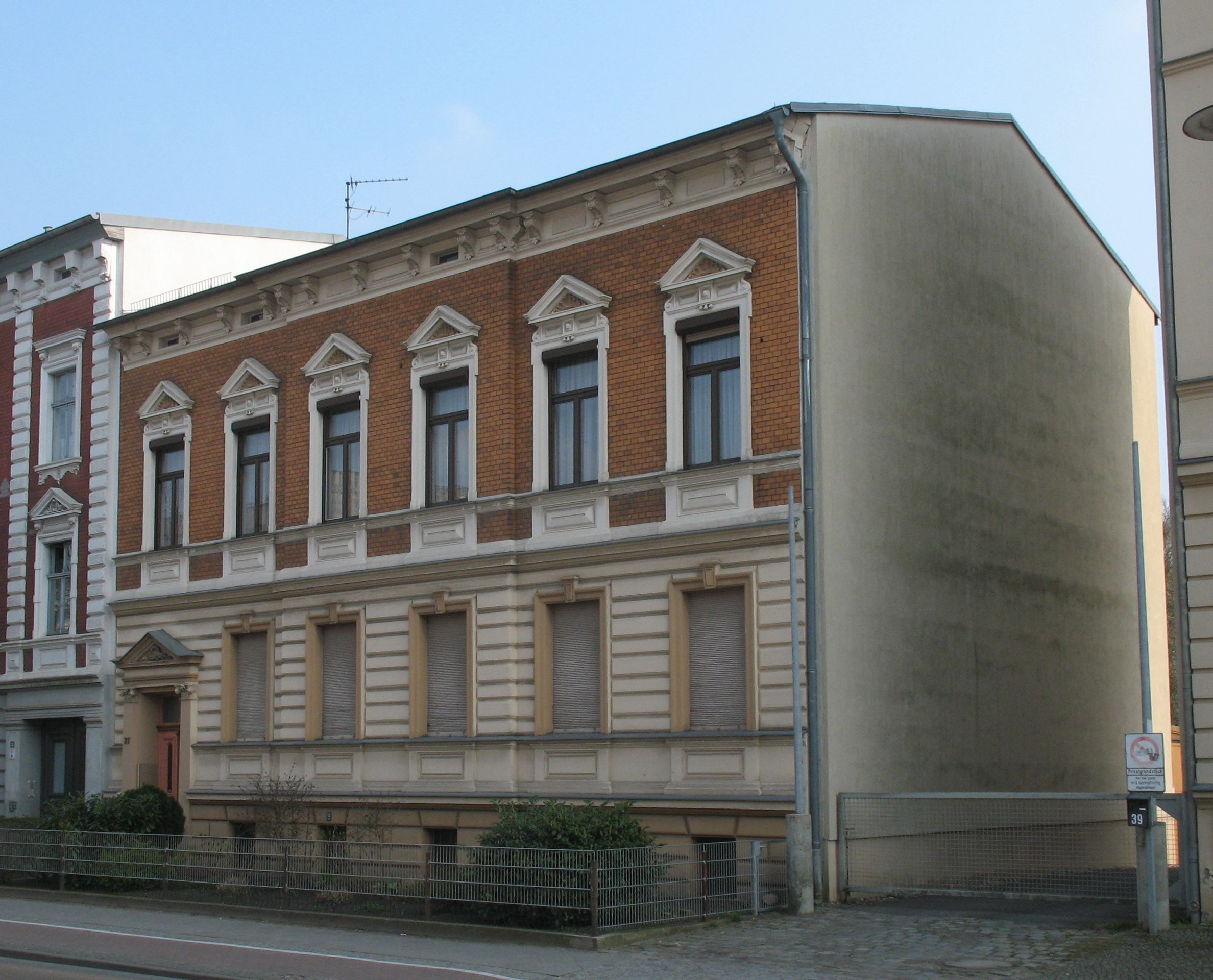

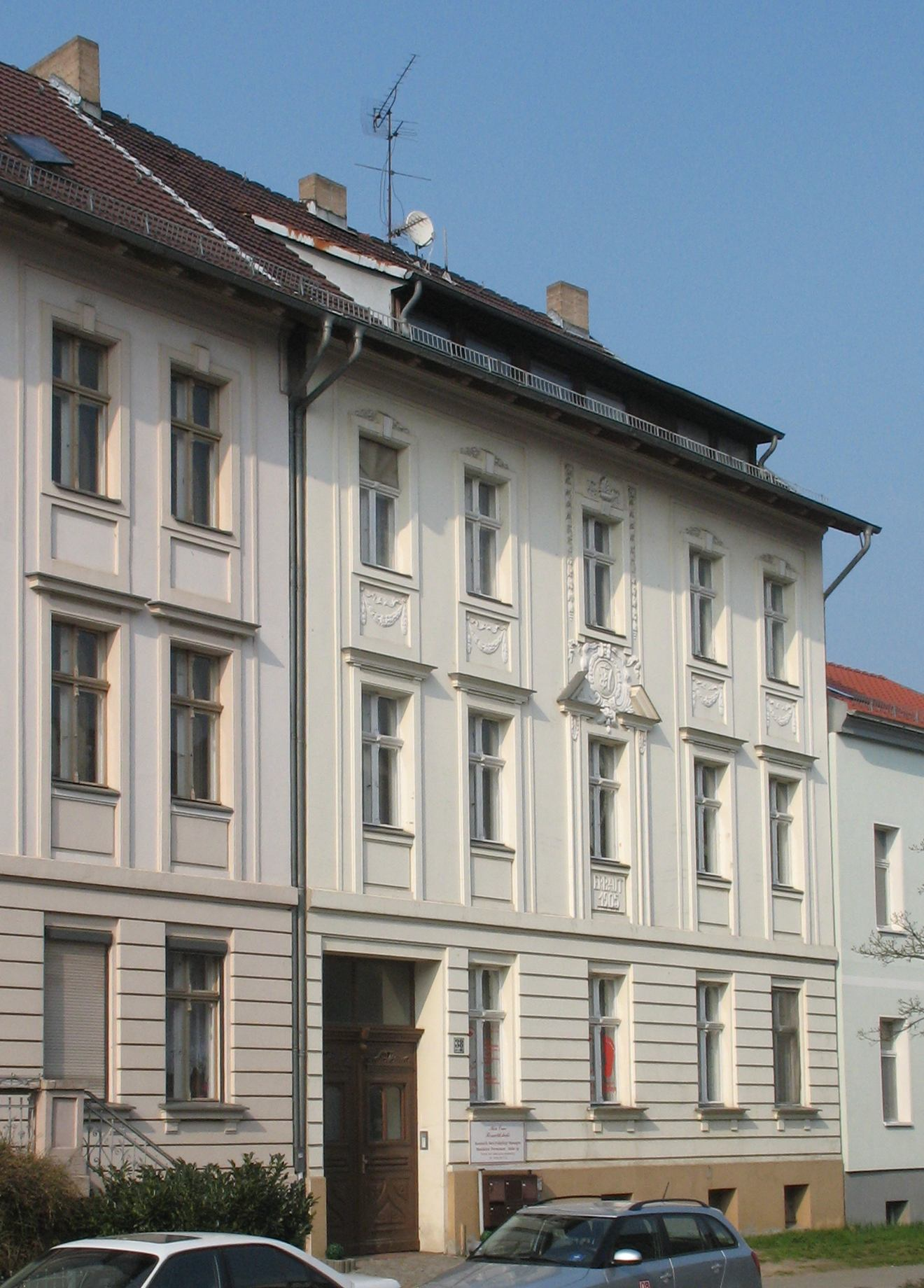

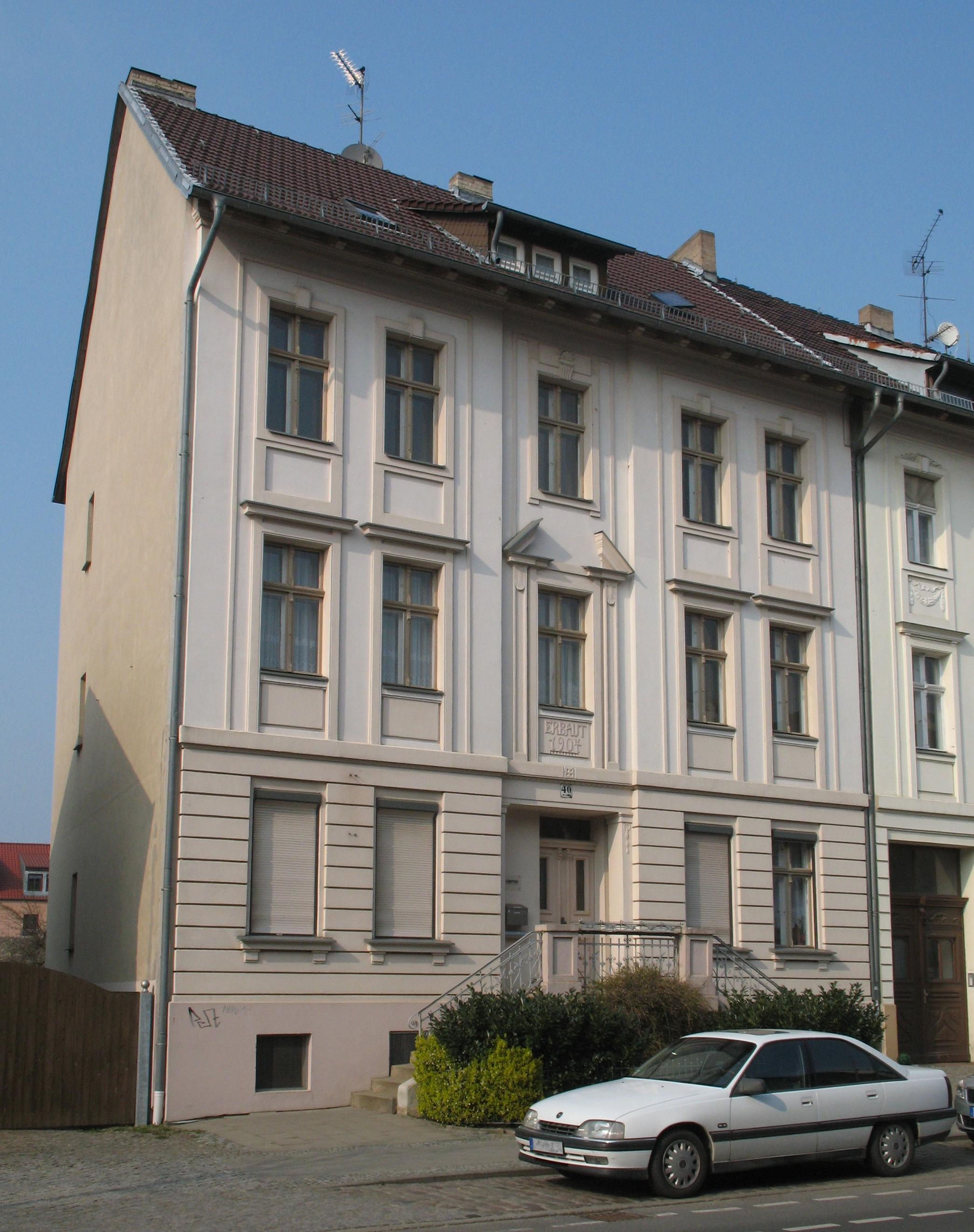

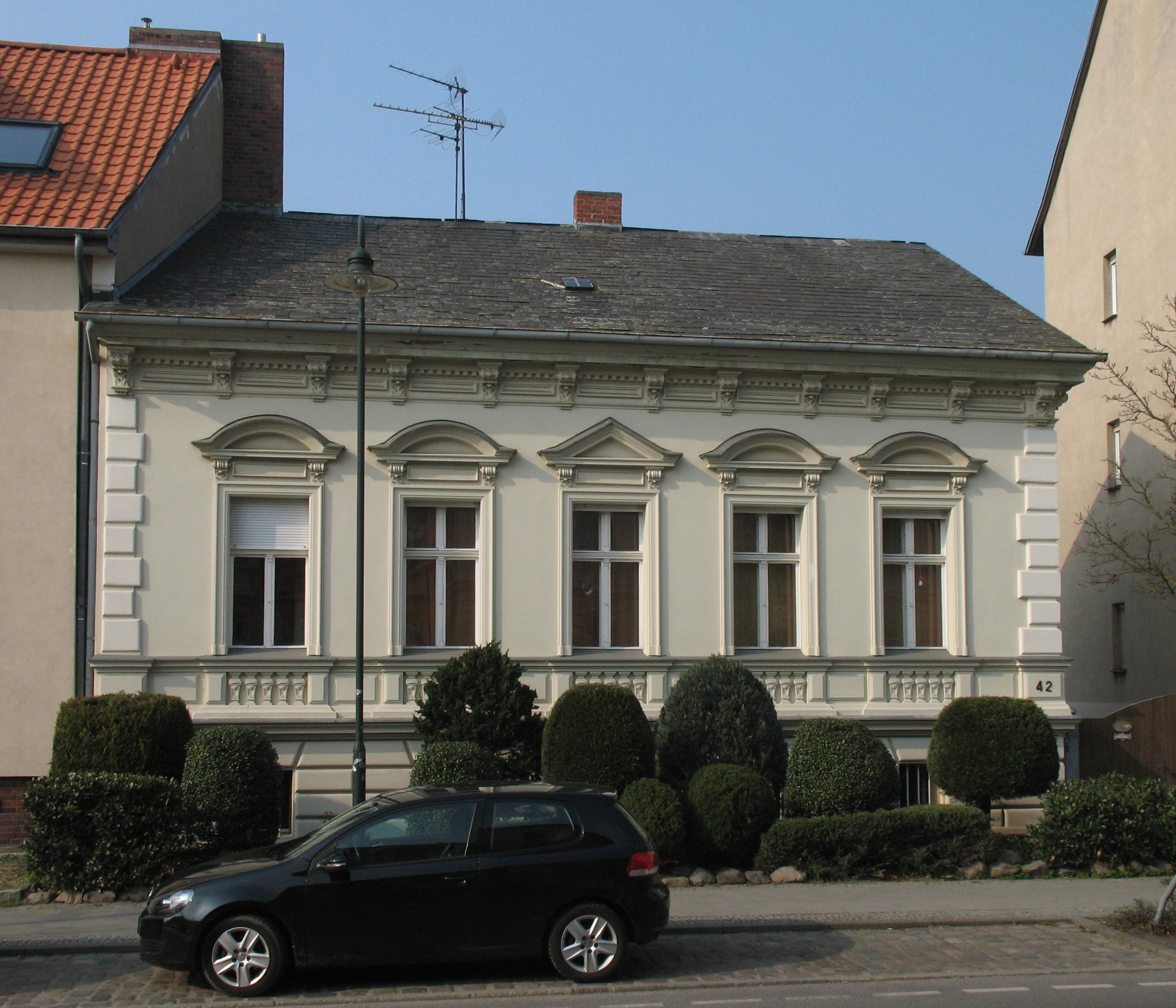

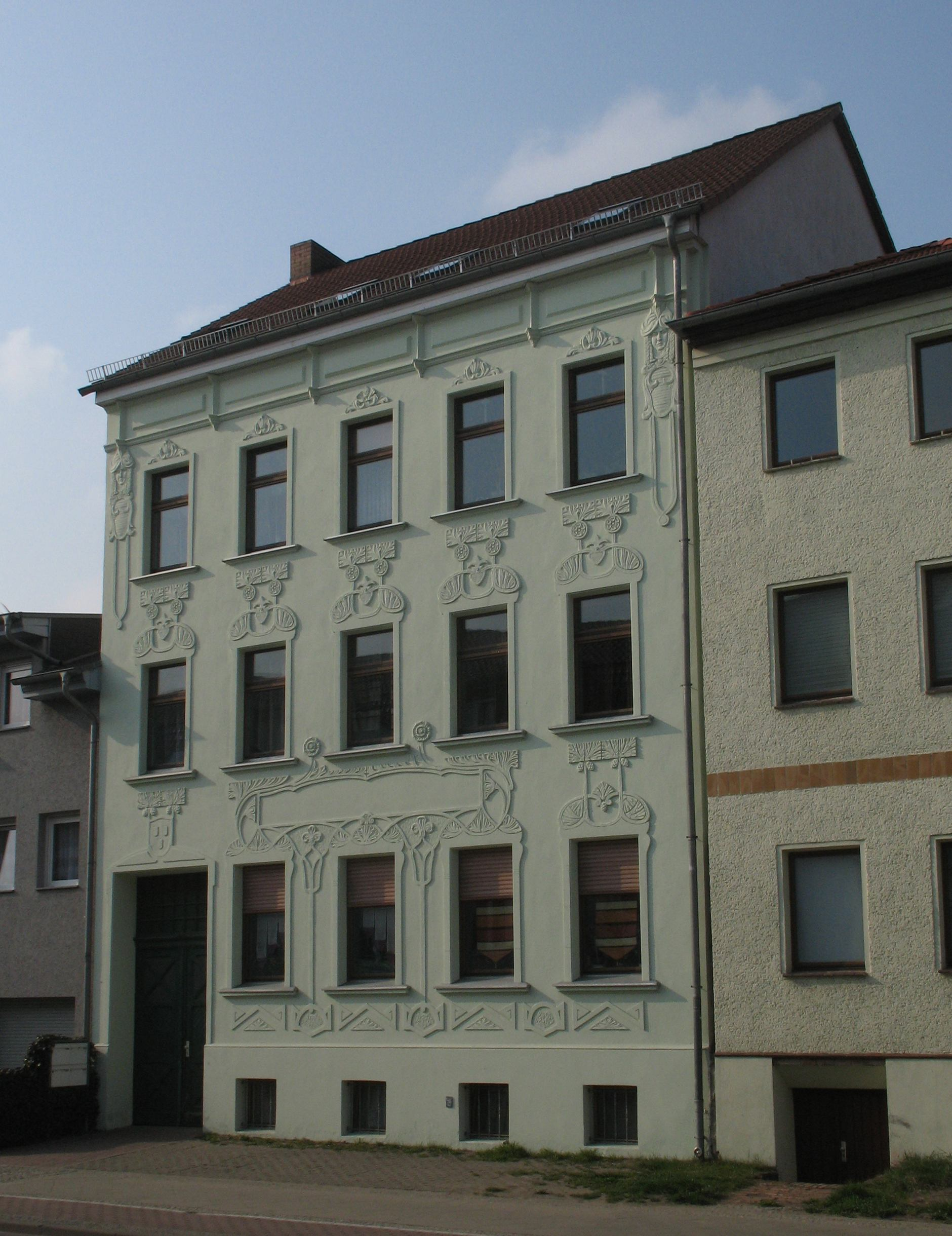

== Transport ==
The line S2 of the Berlin S-Bahn (suburban railway) connects Bernau with Berlin Friedrichstraße's station, in the center of that city. Regional rail connects Bernau with Eberswalde, Schwedt, Stralsund, Frankfurt (Oder) to the north and Berlin Hauptbahnhof, Berlin Lichtenberg and Elsterwerda in the south. Long-distance trains go to Stralsund, Dortmund, Düsseldorf, Dresden and Amsterdam.

The Bundesautobahn A11 from Berlin to Prenzlau and Szczecin has the two exits Bernau Nord (number 15) and Bernau Süd (number 16).

== Twin towns – sister cities ==
Bernau bei Berlin is twinned with:

- Champigny-sur-Marne, France
- Meckenheim, Germany
- Skwierzyna, Poland

== Notable people ==
=== Honorary citizen ===
- Konrad Wolf (1925–1982), film director, President of the Academy of Arts, was the first city commander of Bernau after the Second World War (April 1945) at the age of 19, honorary citizen since 1975

=== Sons and daughters of the city ===
- Anton von Dejanicz-Gliszczynski (1820-1905), politician, member of German Reichstag
- Charlotte Mäder (born 1905), athlete.
- Hans-Jürgen Buchner (born 1944), musician and composer.
- Jeanette Biedermann (born 1980), entertainer.

=== People associated with Bernau ===
- Marianne Buggenhagen (born 1953), several times Paralympics winner, lives in Bernau.
- Wolf Kahlen (born 1940), performance, object and media artist, opened his museum in Bernau in 2005.
- Günther Maleuda (1931–2012), politician (DBD), President of the Volkskammer prior to German reunification .
- Hannes Meyer (1889–1954), architect, built the Bundesschule des Allgemeine Deutscher Gewerkschaftsbundes (ADGB Trade Union School) in Bernau from 1928 to 1930.
- Andreas Müller (born 1961), youth judge in Bernau.
- Johanna Olbrich (1926–2004), spy, lived out her final years in Bernau.
- Arianne Borbach (1962–2024), German voice actress

== See also ==
- Liepnitzsee
