= Bets Dekens =

Dutch discus thrower

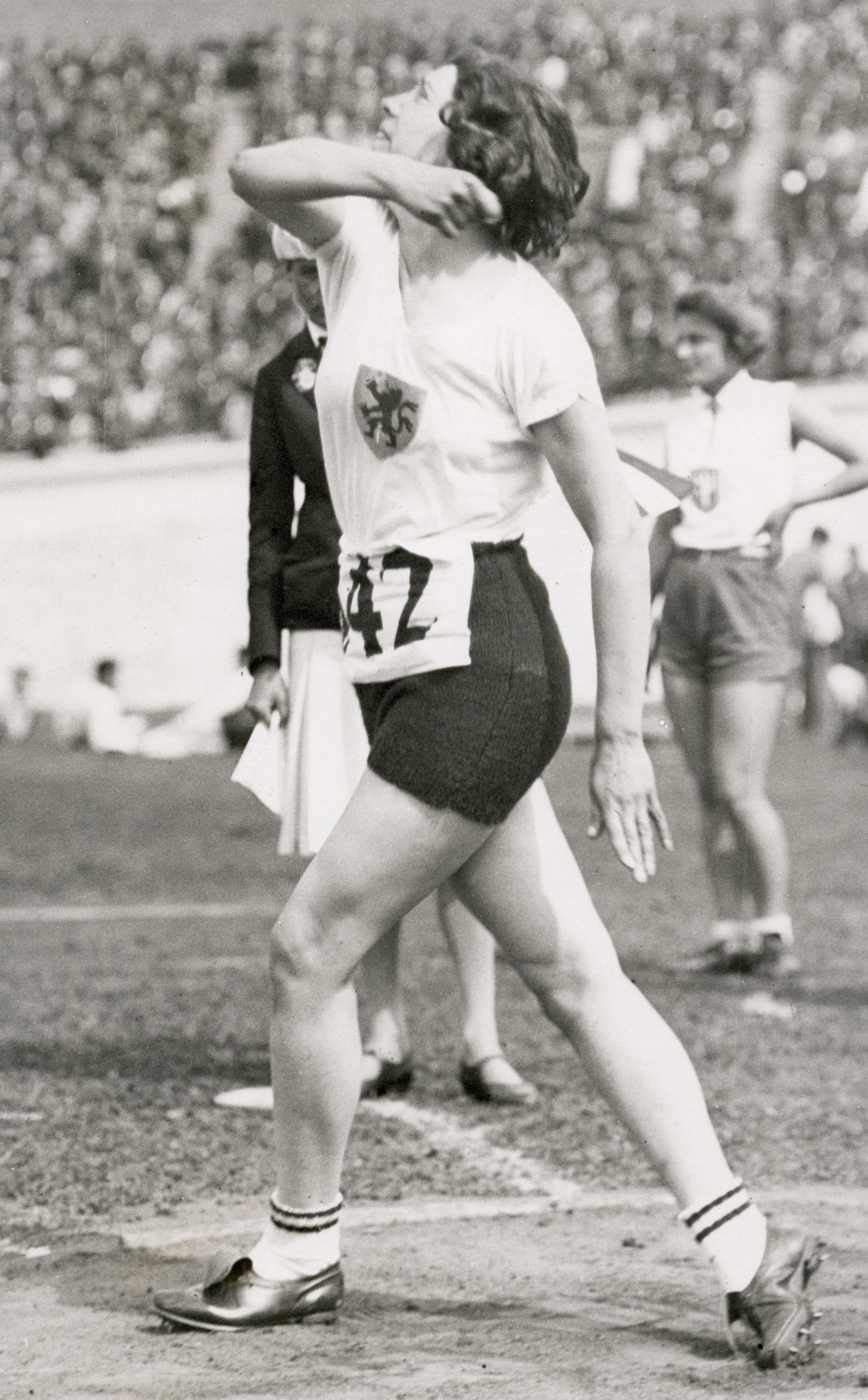
- Bets Dekens at the 1928 Olympics

Personal information
- Born: 25 October 1906 Groningen, Netherlands
- Died: 13 August 1992 (aged 85) Groningen, Netherlands

Sport
- Sport: Discus throw
- Club: KNAU

Berendina Johanna "Bets" Dekens (later de Vries, 25 October 1906 – 13 August 1992) was a Dutch discus thrower. She competed at the 1928 Summer Olympics and finished in 17th place with her all-time best throw of 29.36 meters.

This was the first women's track and field event to be completed in Olympic Games history.
