= Woven Histories =

Marilou Schulz, Replica of a Chip, 1994 exhibited in the Woven Histories exhibition at the Museum of Modern Art, New York, NY

Woven Histories was the name of a traveling exhibition showcasing the use of textiles as a medium in fine art. The exhibition was first shown at the Los Angeles County Museum of Art (September 17, 2023 - January 21, 2024), then the National Gallery of Art in Washington, D.C. (March 17 - July 28, 2024), then the National Gallery of Canada in Ottowa (November 8, 2024 - March 2, 2025), and finally at the Museum of Modern Art in New York (April 20 - September 13, 2025). The full title of the exhibition was Woven Histories: Textiles and Modern Abstraction. It included 55 artists and over 160 works ranging from 1913-2023.

== Curatorial Approach ==
Lynne Cooke, the curator the exhibition, brought together a diverse group of artists whose work challenged the distinction between fine art and craft. The exhibition placed modern abstraction in relation of the industrialization of the textile production and historically gendered divisions of labor post World War I. The type of work in the show spanned weavings, apparel, paintings, basketry, video, design, and more.

Artists from around the world were represented, including Anni Albers, whose textile work connected the principles of modernist abstraction with weaving. Albers studied at the Bauhaus in Germany before emigrating to the United States, where she taught at Black Mountain College in North Carolina.

== Publication ==
An exhibition catalogue with the same name, Woven Histories: Textiles and Modern Abstraction was published in 2023. The catalogue is 292 pages with 190 color plates. Sections include "Modern histories: braided, interlaced, and aligned" by Lynne Cooke, Artists' responses by Lisa Oppenheim, Harmony Hammond, Jeffrey Gibson, Ann Hamilton, Ellen Lesperance, Ulrike Müller, and Carole Frances Lung, "Unavoidable Nature" by Darby English, "Textile thinking" by Briony Fer, "Not your grandmother's labor" by Bibiana K. Obler, "Dimensions of basketry" by Elissa Auther, and "Textiles and technology" by Michelle Kuo. The catalogue was shortlisted for the College Art Association: Alfred H. Barr, Jr. award.

== Participating Artists ==
- Igshaan Adams
- Anni Albers
- Josef Albers
- Polly Apfelbaum
- Ruth Asawa
- Diedrick Brackens
- Liz Collins
- Olga de Amaral
- Sonia Delaunay
- Lillian Elliott
- Martha Erps
- Gego (Gertrud Goldschmidt)
- Jeffrey Gibson
- Dorothy Gill Barnes
- Shan Goshorn
- Gary (GRIZ) Graham
- Eileen Gray
- Ann Hamilton
- Harmony Hammond
- Richard Herre
- Eva Hesse
- Pat Hickman
- Sheila Hicks
- Hannah Höch
- Institute 4 Labor Generosity Workers & Uniforms
- Valerie Jaudon
- Paul Klee
- Yvonne Koolmatrie
- Yayoi Kusama
- Teresa Lanceta
- Zoe Leonard
- Ellen Lesperance
- Carole Frances Lung
- Agnes Martin
- Marisa Merz
- Laura Huertas Millàn
- Ulrike Müller
- Nagakura Ken'ichi
- Senga Nengudi
- Paulina Olowska
- Lisa Oppenheim
- Regina Pilawuk Wilson
- Liubov Popova
- Martin Puryear
- Sascha Reichstein
- Aleksandr Rodchenko
- Ed Rossbach
- François Rouan
- Analia Saban
- Marilou Schultz
- Kay Sekimachi
- Alan Shields
- Varvara Stepanova
- Gunta Stölzl
- Sophie Taeuber-Arp
- Tanabe Yōta
- Lenore Tawney
- Rosemarie Trockel
- Katherine Westphal
- Jack Whitten
- Andrea Zittel
