= Nance O'Banion =

American artist (1949–2018)

Nance O'Banion (1949–2018) was an Oakland-based American artist who "pioneered creative explorations of handmade paper". She is known for her sculptural paper works and book works which focus on themes of change and transformation. A retrospective sample of the arc of her work may be viewed at: https://nance-obanion.com

== Early life and education ==
Nance O'Banion was born in Oakland, California and grew up in San Leandro, California. She received her Bachelor of Arts from University of California, Berkeley, in 1971 and her Master of Arts in 1973.

== Career ==
In 1970 O'Banion began to explore the use of handmade paper as a sculptural medium. By 1977 she was "well known for her long involvement in the Bay Area fiber arts movement". Her artworks ranged from large, public sculptures to unique limited-edition books to drawn or painted wood tablets. Over the last two decades her work underwent a striking transformation, both in scale, from the grand to the intimate, and in content, from the abstract to the symbolic. This was due in part to neurological changes and their resulting perceptual insights, but also to a growing desire to communicate a more intensely personal vision in her work. This most recent body of work was featured in the solo exhibition Present Tense at California College of the Arts in 2016, which included 11 books and over 650 drawings documenting her unique and introspective personal journey.

== Awards and fellowships ==
O'Banion won two National Endowment for the Arts Awards, the first in 1982, the second in 1988.

== Selected exhibitions ==
O'Banion has exhibited internationally in both solo and group exhibitions. Selected solo exhibitions include:

- Present Tense (2016) at Tecoah Bruce Gallery, Oliver Art Center, California College of the Arts, Oakland, California, USA
- Breaking the Surface: Telling Stories (2001) at John F Kennedy University Gallery, Berkeley, California, USA
- Day Dreams from the Heart (1998) at Oakland Museum of California, USA
- Daydreams in 3-D (1991) at The Allrich Gallery, San Francisco, California, USA
- Science in Action: At Home (1987), at The Allrich Gallery, San Francisco, California, USA
- Windows, Curtains, Maps and Rocks (1985) at Kaufman Gallery, Houston, Texas, USA
- Hestkobgard (1983), Birkerod, Denmark
- Gallery Coco (1993), Kyoto, Japan
- Bank of America World Headquarters (1981), San Francisco, California, USA

== Collections ==
Nance O'Banion's work is held in numerous public and private collections including:

- Fine Arts Museums of San Francisco, USA
- Museum of Arts and Design, New York, USA
- SFO Museum, San Francisco, USA
- Seattle Art Museum, USA
- Cleveland Museum of Art, USA
- Minneapolis Institute of Art, USA

== Teaching ==
In the early 1970s O'Banion was faculty at the Fiberworks Center for the Textile Arts, an experimental fiber art institution founded in Berkeley by Gyöngy Laky in 1973. She began working at California College of Arts and Crafts (now California College of the Arts) in 1974 and was a professor there for over 40 years. At CCA Nance taught innovative programs in the fine arts with a focus on printmaking, textiles, papermaking, and book arts. She led courses within the individualized major and graduate programs which, like the arc of her own work, transcended disciplines and media. During her tenure she served as Printmaking Chair and President of the Faculty Senate, as well as being a mentor to individual faculty. In addition to her work at CCA she taught courses and workshops throughout the United States, Europe, and Canada. Her courses, like her art, reflect a multimedia, interdisciplinary, and often collaborative approach to creativity.
