= Ana Lisa Hedstrom =

American fiber artist (born 1943)

- Born: 1943; Detroit, Michigan
- Known for: Fiber art
- Website: analisahedstrom.com

Ana Lisa Hedstrom (born 1943, Detroit) is an American fiber artist. She is best known for incorporating traditional Japanese shibori into her work. She attended Mills College. She continued her studies at Kyoto City University of Arts. Hedstrom learned the traditional dyeing technique of shibori from Yoshiko Iwamoto Wada at a workshop at the Fiberworks Center for the Textile Arts.

Her work is in the collection of the Cooper Hewitt, Smithsonian Design Museum, the Museum of Arts and Design, the Oakland Museum of California.

In 2003 Hedstrom was named a fellow of the American Craft Council.
