= Lillian Elliott (textile designer) =

American textile artist

- Born: Lillian Wolock; June 4, 1930; Detroit, Michigan, U.S.
- Died: 1994 (aged 63–64); Berkeley, California, U.S.
- Education: Wayne State University, Cranbrook Academy of Art
- Employer(s): Ford Motor Company, University of California, Berkeley
- Spouse: H. Roy Elliott
- Children: 2

Lillian Elliott (née Wolock; June 6, 1930 – April 3, 1994) was an American fiber artist, and textile designer. She is known for her innovative basket craft.

== Biography ==
Lillian Wolock was born in 1930 in Detroit, Michigan, to Polish Jewish immigrants Litman "Leon" Wolock from Włodzimierce and Edith Freedman Wolock from Bereźne (both now in Ukraine). She had three siblings. She attended Wayne State University (B.A. degree, 1952), and Cranbrook Academy of Art (M.F.A. degree, 1955). After she graduated school, she worked at Ford Motor Company, as a designer from 1955 to 1958.

In 1960, she moved to California and became active within the California Craft movement, working initially in woven tapestry and fiber arts. Her work changed in the 1970s and expanded to include experiments with textile and printing on textiles. By 1975, she was practicing basketry with unconventional materials, such as cloth, bark, paper, twine, and zippers.

She taught at the University of California, Berkeley, from 1966 to 1971. While teaching at UC Berkeley, Elliott met her lifelong friend and colleague, Joanne Segal Brandford. Her longtime collaborator was artist Pat Hickman, who started as her student. One of Elliott's two children was born in 1968 as Aaron Elliott, he would go on to be known as Aaron Cometbus.

== Death and legacy ==
In 1985, Elliott was awarded the designation as one of 20 "Living Treasures of California" by the Crocker Art Museum and the Creative Arts League. She was elected as a fellow of American Craft Council in 1992. Elliott died of cancer in 1994 in Berkeley, California.

Elliott's namesake award, The Brandford/Elliott Award for Excellence in Fiber Art, previously The Elliott Award, is awarded biennially at the Textile Society of America's Symposium. Award nominees are selected anonymously from among emerging fiber artists perceived to be willing to take creative risks with their work.

Elliott has work in public museum collections including Smithsonian American Art Museum, the Fine Arts Museums of San Francisco, Rhode Island School of Design Museum, and the San Jose Museum of Quilts & Textiles.
