= Joanne Segal Brandford =

American textile artist

- Born: Joanne Peppi Segal; 1933; Philadelphia, PA
- Died: April 5, 1994 (aged 60–61); Petaluma, CA
- Education: UC Berkeley
- Known for: Fiber arts and basketry
- Notable work: Reclining Figure (1992); Bundle (1992); Icarus' Wing (1991)
- Spouse: Paul Brandford (m. 1953)
- Children: 3
- Awards: 1990 – Fellow, New York Foundation for the Arts; 1986-1987 – Basketmaker-in-Residence, Manchester Polytechnic; 1980 – Artist-in-Residence, Fiberworks; 1971-1978 – Research Fellow in Textile Art, Peabody Museum of Archaeology and Ethnology; 1971-1973 Fellow, Bunting Fellowship, Radcliffe College

Joanne Segal Brandford (1933 – April 5, 1994) was a pioneer and leader in the fiber arts community as an artist, basketmaker, master dyer, teacher, scholar of ancient and contemporary world textile traditions, and art museum curator. Her artwork included woven textiles, lace, looped structures, nets, and interlaced sprang. Using non-traditional materials and techniques, she is best known for her basket-like forms. Brandford gradually accepted the moniker basketmaker. Brandford is a namesake for The Brandford/Elliott Award for Excellence in Fiber Art, awarded biennially at the Textile Society of America Symposium. Her expertise was in ethnic textiles, with a focus on North, Central, and Andean American textiles. Brandford died at age 60 on April 5, 1994.

== Early life and education ==
Joanne Segal Brandford was born in Philadelphia, Pennsylvania as Joanne Peppi Segal in 1933. She attended the University of California, Berkeley for undergraduate and graduate degrees, attaining an Associate's Degree in the Arts with honors in 1953. In 1955, Brandford completed a Bachelor of Arts in Decorative Arts and went on to complete a Master of Arts in Design in 1967. During her undergraduate studies, Brandford completed a course on textile history with "Miss Gayton." This course was an important influence on her future career, allowing Brandford to "naïvely" believe that textiles were a discipline of fine art. While working in the design department under the tutelage of Charles "Ed" Rossbach, the head of the Textile Design Program and the acknowledged dean of contemporary American textiles, Brandford met and worked alongside Lillian Elliott, who became her lifelong friend and colleague.

Subsequently, Brandford brought the educational philosophy of UC Berkeley to the East coast by teaching at the Rhode Island School of Design, Montclair State College, Goddard College, Wheelock College, Massachusetts College of Art, and the Radcliffe Seminars.

== Basketry as art ==
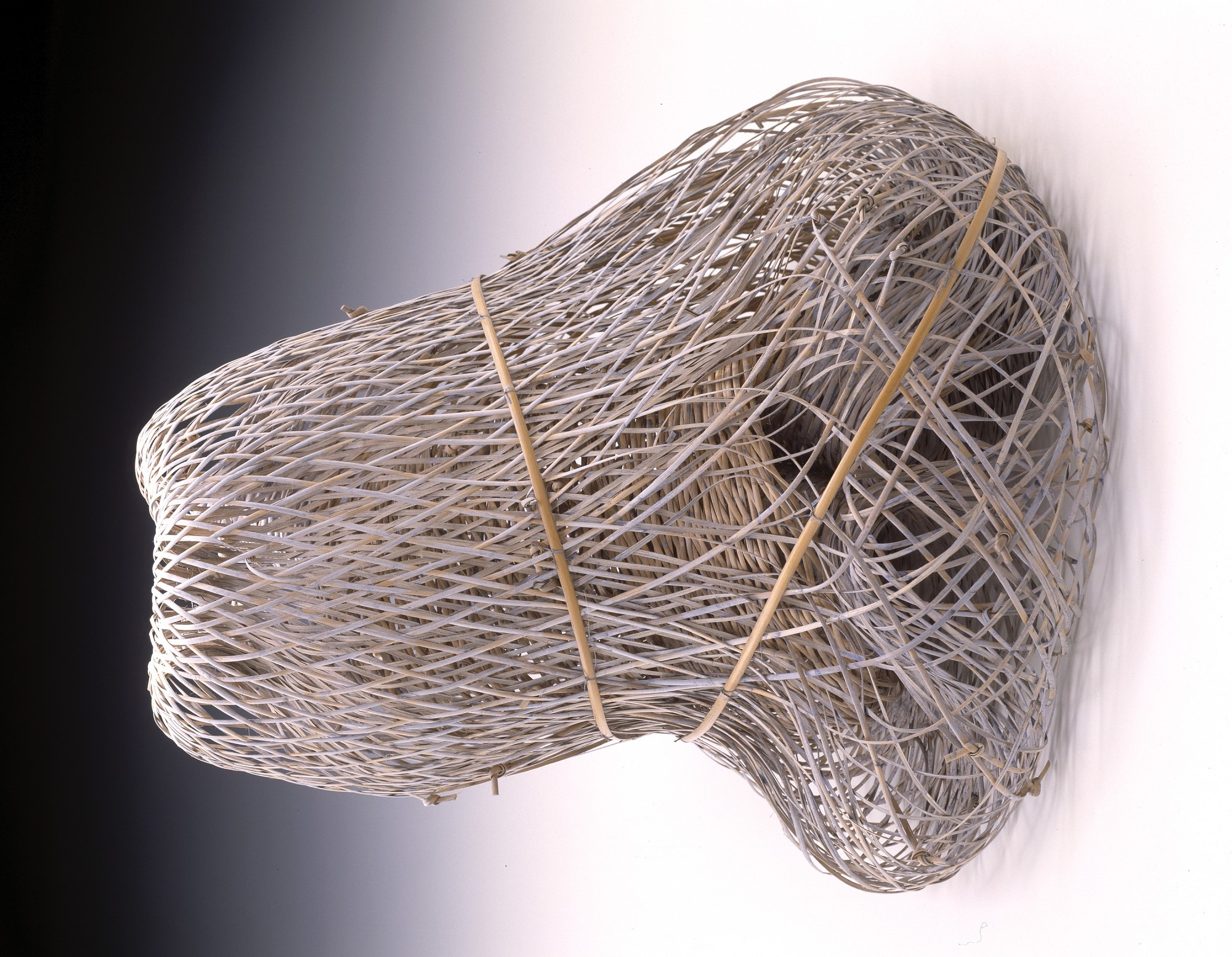
Bundle, created by Joanne Segal Brandford (1992)

Barbara Goldberg, Professor of Fiber Arts at the University of Massachusetts Dartmouth, describes Brandford's works using three categories: the early works, nets, and baskets. Goldberg's article "Joanne Segal Brandford" was presented to The Textile Society of America's Symposium in 2004. During the 2014 Symposium proceedings, both Catherine Hunter and Jo Stealey spoke about the impact that Brandford had on textile arts.

Throughout her career, Brandford taught and studied various aspects of the fiber arts at a variety of different institutions and conferences. Brandford also curated, annotated, researched, and catalogued many notable textile and fiber arts collections. Her research and curation allowed Brandford to become an expert in ancient textiles and working techniques, simultaneously, basketry emerged as a special interest for research and her artwork. Brandford based her nets and baskets on ethnographic research that she conducted. In the catalog for The North American Basket, 1790-1976, she wrote that the purpose of the exhibit was to document and explore traditional and contemporary basketry that "basketry as art is our main focus."

In 1993, Brandford presented her basketry studies and artwork in a lecture and an artist statement for the catalogue BASKETS: Redefining Volume and Meaning at the University of Hawaii Art Gallery.

Baskets are often linked to domesticity and smallness, the implication being that these qualities preclude significant artwork. I could counter with basket-shrines made for ritual, or I could point to house-sized baskets (used, indeed, as houses), and so I could ‘elevate’ baskets with religious significance or architectural scale. But all such uses/meanings refer to our humanity, and consequently ourselves and to our families, to life and to death. What can be more meaningful for an artist working in fiber, than to honor the basket, with its myriad human associations.

— Joanne Segal Brandford, BASKETS: Redefining Volume and Meaning

=== The early works ===
In 1965 and 1966, Brandford began working with silk screen printing while studying at UC Berkeley. She manipulated the patterns so that they would not repeat in ways that were expected of screen printing at that time. The patterns were curvilinear geometric designs with some pieces being cut apart and reorganized, and with some pieces she would rotate the silk screen 180 degrees to alter a single row on a piece. The rotation of the silk screen can be seen on pieces such as a black and white cotton weaving that Brandford created in 1965.

It was during this time period that Brandford became an expert in using vat dyes, as well as working with other dyes, such as indigo sol, to create tie-dye pieces with muted colors and subtle shifts in color. Brandford would use different patterning techniques, including folding, stitching, binding, and pleating, to create the designs that her early work was recognized by. Beginning in 1967 at UC Berkeley as a part of her postgraduate degree, Brandford taught textile history, attaining her degree in 1969.

The final styles that are classified into Brandford's early works are her weavings made from 1970 to 1974 and her first 3-dimensional sprang pieces. Goldberg describes one ikat-dyed weaving named Fragment Series II as "[illustrating Brandford's] achievement as a master dyer." In the early 1970s, Brandford began experimenting with 3-dimensional, sculptural forms using sprang. One such piece from this time was Spring, 1973, which is featured in Jack Lenor Larsen's book and the exhibition of the same name, The Dyer's Art: Ikat, Batik, Plangi, an ikat and sprang construction. Brandford used sprang throughout her career. During this period, Brandford taught at multiple institutions. From 1970 to 1972, she taught at the Cambridge Center for Adult Education and Project, Inc., Massachusetts. In 1971, Branford began teaching at the Massachusetts College of Art and Design, Boston, ending in 1974.

=== Nets ===
The second grouping of works that define Brandford's career are nets. In the late 1960s and early 1970s, Brandford began experimenting with the creation of nets using materials such as raffia, nylon, monofilament, and rattan, as well as using new techniques. In her 1993 lecture at the University of Hawaii, Breathing Baskets, Brandford explained that she began making nets because of the influence of her teaching assistant, Wendy, and her office mate, Lillian Elliot. At the time Wendy had been using basketry and net-making techniques to create art. She went on to explain that while she was teaching about historical textiles, specifically baskets and nets, she was "rather intimidated by those perfect baskets, those exquisite nets." Brandford's nets were made by interlacing and knotting different, typically natural, fibers into different shapes and sizes. Some nets were dyed (Note: Red-Green II, 1977/1978 – 60 in x 40 in, linen and cotton, two nets displayed hanging apart from one another to change the experience depending on viewing angle.) while some were embroidered, (Note: Embroidered Net, 1977 – 45 in x 39 in, knotted silk and synthetic fiber net embroidered with ikat threads) and others were left simply as nets. (Note: Untitled, 1987 – 6 ft x 11 ft x 6.5 ft, nylon and polyester.)

Her nets were displayed either as wall art in a static form or in the round while hanging from the ceiling. One such piece was Red-Green II (1977/1978), two linen and cotton nets that were hung apart from each other to create "drawings" that would change depending on viewing angle. Jeanne Mackin of the Ithaca Journal writes about Structure, an approximately 6 ft square net that was dyed after construction in shades of green. She explains that instead of the net hanging directly against the wall, it is displayed a few inches off of the wall so that the shadow that is cast by the net is a part of the work itself.

Brandford created nets to explore "ambiguity, illusion, [and] translucency." Many of her well-known nets are crafted with parachute nylon, creating nearly invisible pieces of art that she would sometimes embroider or weave. Freudenheim of the New York Times described these works as "nebulous as a misty cloud. Its knotted threads are almost invisible, except where a spotlight glistens on their surfaces." Untitled, created in 1987, was a landmark net for Brandford. It was the largest of her pieces up to that point, measuring 6 ft x 11 ft x 6.5 ft, and used colorless synthetic materials – nylon and polyester. Goldberg describes this piece as "a work of considerable size with almost no substance, a visually fragile and ephemeral work."

In 1971, Brandford was chosen for two fellowships. She became a Radcliffe Bunting Fellow, lasting until 1973, and a Research Fellow at the Peabody Museum of Archaeology and Ethnology, lasting until 1978. In the late 1970s, Brandford moved to Ithaca, NY, as well as teaching at three different institutions: Rhode Island School of Design and Fiberworks Center for the Textile Arts in 1977, and Montclair State University in 1979. After moving to Ithaca, Brandford curated and catalogued the Cornell costume collection. In 1976, she curated the North American Basket 1790-1976 at the Worcester Center for Crafts in Massachusetts.

Brandford continued making nets until she died, some were made three dimensional and basket-like, while others remained as two dimensional pieces. Body Scan I (1988) and Body Scan II (1989) were nylon nets that were embroidered with faint shapes that resembled human forms. The works that she created towards the end of her life often referenced or suggested the human form and humanity.

=== Baskets ===
Beginning in the early 1980s, the nets and sprang that Brandford created began taking more basket-like shapes, though she distanced these from actual baskets. Brandford has stated, "I am not a basketmaker. My 'baskets' are not really baskets. I think they are images of baskets." She further said:

I never used traditional basket making techniques, feeling that these ways of working belonged to others. This was a curiously conservative attitude which was at once limiting (I didn't give myself permission to make baskets) and liberating (but I could make basket-like nets and call them 'baskets'). [sic]

Brandford extensively studied North American basketry techniques, although she did not use traditional basketry techniques such as twining or plaiting for her pieces. Many of her basket-like works of this period are painted or dyed rattan and pandanus.

In 1980 and 1981 curated two notable collections, at the Peabody Museum of Archaeology and Ethnology, she curated the Native North American baskets, and at the Roberson Museum and Science Center in Binghamton, New York, she curated the Our Shining Heritage, Textile Arts of the Slavs and Their Neighbors exhibition. In 1984, she worked again with the Peabody Museum to curate From the Tree Where the Bark Grows, North American Baskets, which was a traveling exhibition. Also in 1984, Brandford catalogued and photographed the Native American basket collection at Wadsworth Athenaeum, in Hartford, Connecticut.

From 1986 to 1987, Brandford served as Basketmaker-in-Residence at Manchester Polytechnic in England. When speaking about being chosen for the position, Brandford stated, "I was very concerned about my role there as a basketmaker and also as a teacher." While in England, Brandford focused on sprang, using looms to weave shapes that were naturally elastic, flexible, and buoyant. Two works created during this time were a rattan and cotton piece, Untitled Basket, 1986, which measures 19 in x 22.5 in x 17 in, and a rattan piece, Blue Bowl, 1987, that measures 5.75 in x 10 in x 9.25 in. Brandford was influenced by Manchester and the Museum of English Rural Life during her time in England. Due to this influence, Brandford created two knotted net pieces, Pot and Another Pot, and a knotless net piece, Flask, 1987.

In December 1989, selected works by Brandford, including Basket IV, were on display in the Knots and Netting exhibition at the Parrish Museum in Southampton, she also worked as a research historian for the show. A New York Times review of the exhibition described Basket IV as being made "with natural fibers, in an open construction" and that it "seems to have been intentionally crushed down to give it solidity and significance." Basket IV, created in 1981, was a dyed rattan form that was woven while wet so that when it dried it would maintain its basket-like shape. In 1990, the New York Foundation for the Arts awarded Brandford with a fellowship.

During 1993, Brandford exhibited multiple pieces and lectured at the University of Hawaii in Honolulu for Hickman's Baskets: Redefining Volume and Meaning. In the December 1993 article "Baskets speaking volumes" in American Craft (magazine), Morse described Brandford's work as "[providing] a transition between abstraction and figuration." She went on to say, "[Reclining Figure] eloquently captures the gesture of its title in an open mesh of rattan wiped with acrylic paint that suggests psychic weathering." Morse went on to note that a correlation could be seen between Brandford's work and that of Elliott.

In 1993, Brandford began work on her final pieces. One piece that came out of this time in her life was Shelter, a rattan and kozo basket that measures 9.5 in x 24 in x 25 in. Her works and their titles became self-reflective as she approached the end of her life.

=== Exhibitions ===
Brandford was credited with having 13 solo and numerous group exhibitions throughout her life. Some of her solo exhibitions include Joanne Segal Brandford: Baskets and Nets at the San Francisco Craft and Folk Art Museum, multiple shows at the Amos Eno Gallery in New York, where Brandford was a member, Fiberwork by Joanne Segal Brandford at 171 Cedar Arts Center in Corning, and Networks at Cornerhouse Gallery in Manchester. 15 Steps Gallery in Ithaca, NY, featured Brandford's works multiple times. One such exhibition was Recent Nets and Baskets 1986-1989.

== Legacy and death ==
=== The Brandford/Elliott Award ===
The Brandford/Elliott Award for Excellence in Fiber Art is presented biennially at the Textile Society of America Biennial Symposium. Award nominees are selected from among emerging fiber artists perceived to be willing to take creative risks with their work. The award was created in 1995 under the name Lillian Elliott Award (LEA) and renamed to The Brandford/Elliott Award for Excellence in Fiber Art (B/EA) in 2012. The award was created to honor the lives, work, and impacts of Lillian Elliot and Joanne Segal Brandford on the fiber arts. Oversight of the award was transferred to the Textile Society of America in 2020.

=== Memorials, retrospectives, and notable works ===
In the fall of 1982, Brandford's work was included in a lace workshop that was organized by the Cooper-Hewitt Museum, Office of Public Programs. A Basketmaker's Legacy: Joanne Segal Brandford, 1933-1994, was a memorial retrospective exhibition at Sybaris Gallery, Royal Oak, Michigan, from October 21, 1995, until December 2, 1995.

Brandford's works are represented in numerous permanent private and public collections. Peppi's Flowers, 1988, named for Brandford's childhood nickname, is a pigmented silk knotless net that resides in the collections of the Cleveland Museum of Art. Bundle, 1992, a painted rattan, kozo, and nylon piece, is in the Smithsonian American Art Museum collection. Shelter, 1993, a dyed and painted Japanese kozo fiber and rattan piece, is in the Arkansas Museum of Fine Arts collection. The Cornell Fashion and Textile Collection holds multiple pieces from Brandford's private collection as well as one of her works, a knotless net made of nylon filament fiber made between 1980 and 1989. Jack Lenor Larson's private collection contains multiple pieces by Brandford. In 2014, the Smithsonian American Art Museum acquired much of Brandford's collection.

=== Death ===
On April 5, 1994, Brandford died at Marin General Hospital of a heart ailment at the age of 60. A memorial service was held for her in Mill Valley, CA. She was survived by her husband, Paul, and three children.
