= Bisa Butler =

American fiber artist (born 1973)

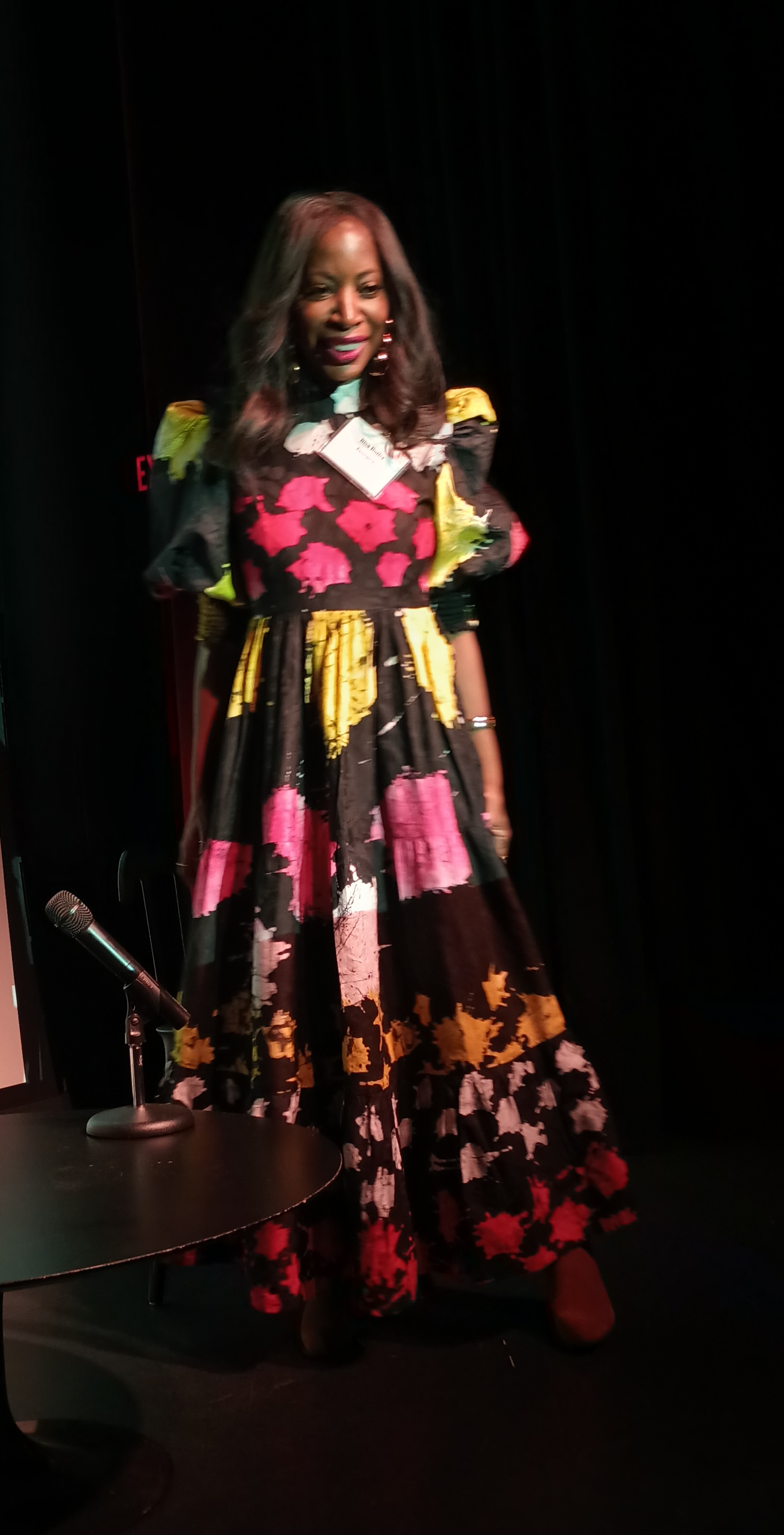
- Butler in November 2025
- Born: Mailissa Yamba Butler; 1973 (age 52–53); Orange, New Jersey, U.S.
- Education: Howard University; Montclair State University
- Known for: Fiber art, quilt art

External videos
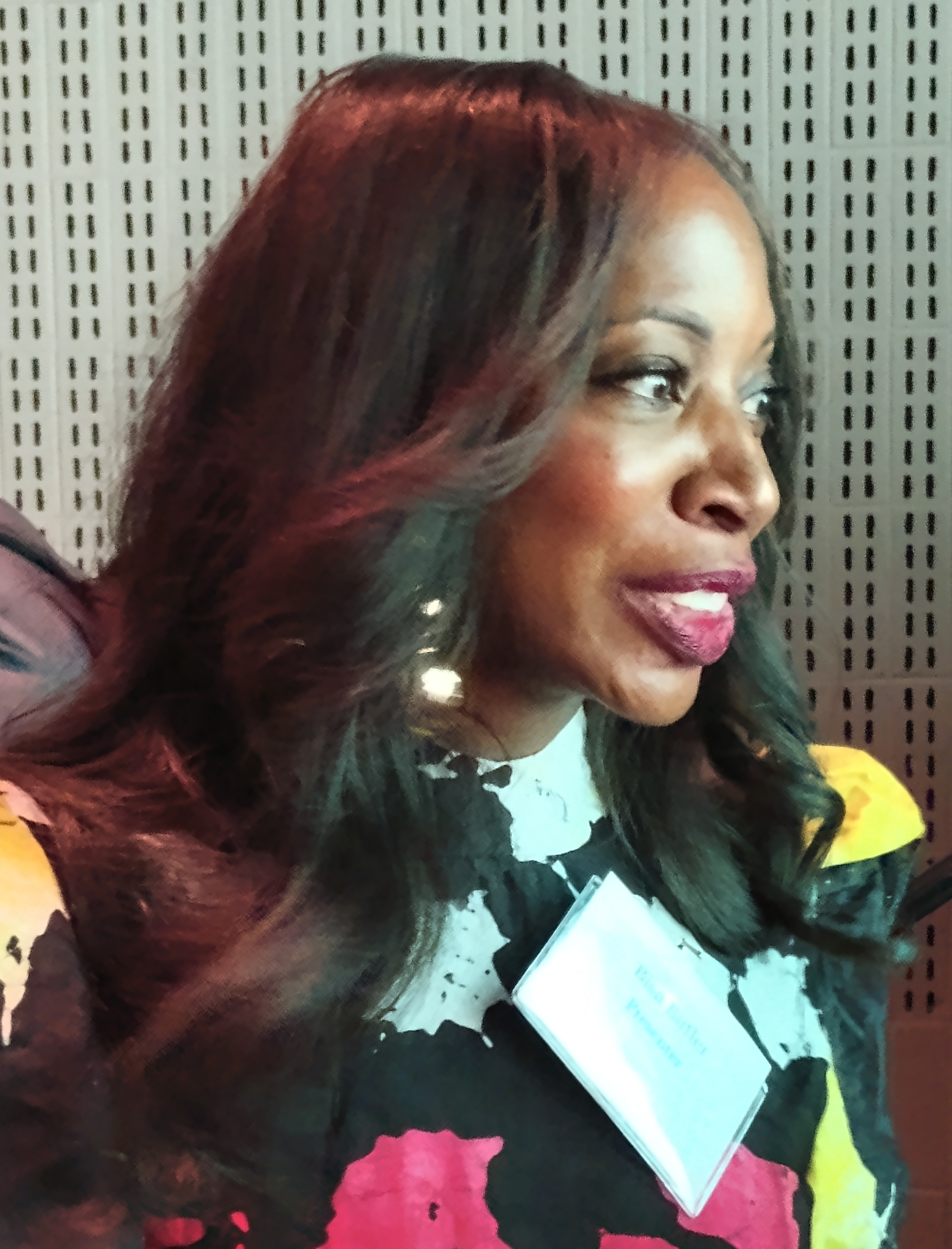
- Artist Bisa Butler on creating new narratives through portrait quilts, CBS This Morning, September 4, 2021.
- Positively Black: Bisa Butler's 'The Warmth of Other Suns', NBC New York
- Bisa Butler: Quilting for Culture, Art Institute of Chicago, October 15, 2020

Bisa Butler (born Mailissa Yamba Butler in 1973) is an African American fiber artist who is credited with creating a new genre of quilting, using photographs, sketches, and vivid traditional textiles to create vibrant life-size portraits in fabric. She is known for celebrating Black life and identity, portraying both everyday people and notable historical figures. Although quilting has long been considered a craft, Butler's use of interdisciplinary methods to create elaborate quilts that look like paintings is bringing recognition both to her work and to the medium of quilting as a whole, as a fine art form.

Butler's works have been exhibited widely and are in the permanent collections of museums including the Smithsonian's National Museum of African American History and Culture, Smithsonian American Art Museum, Art Institute of Chicago, Museum of Fine Arts, Boston, and Pérez Art Museum Miami. In 2020, she was commissioned to quilt cover images for Time magazine, including the "Person of the Year" issue and the "100 Women of the Year" issue.

== Early life and education ==
Bisa Butler, born Mailissa Yamba Butler, was born in Orange, New Jersey, grew up in South Orange, and graduated from Columbia High School in 1991. Her mother is a French teacher from New Orleans and her father, a college president, was born in Ghana. The youngest child in her family, Butler had three siblings. When Butler was born, her older sister could not pronounce her name and shortened it to Bisa.

Butler majored in fine art and graduated cum laude from Howard University, where she studied the work of Romare Bearden, attended lectures by prominent black artists such as Lois Mailou Jones, and studied under lecturers such as Elizabeth Catlett, Jeff Donaldson, and Ernie Barnes. Her undergraduate degree was in painting, but she has stated that she never really connected with the medium. She did start working with fabric, making collages on canvas.

Butler went on to complete a master's degree in art education from Montclair State University in 2005. There, she took a Fiber Art class that inspired her choice of quilting as an artistic medium. She had always watched her mother and grandmother sew. She made a quilt for her grandmother on her deathbed, replicating her grandmother's wedding photo in quilt form. When she presented the piece, entitled "Francis and Violette", both she and her professor recognized it as an entirely new form of quilting.

Butler explained her art practice in a 2023 interview with Art & Object magazine:

"I don't come from a quilting background. My grandmother and mother sewed because they loved fashion, and they gave me all the remnants of their pieces, which I used for quilting. I used silk, chiffon, lace, gaberdine, wool. I still use these today, whereas a typical quilt would be made of cotton. I first made a quilted portrait of my grandmother. We both loved it, and it felt so right. I still make portraits, not just of my family and friends, but of people who remind me of people I know, typically people of the African American community, or a portrait of a famous figure. And I still use those garment fabrics because I like the way they look when I layer them. It's kind of like painting, using light, shadow, contour, and rendering, but with fabric."

Erica Warren of the Art Institute of Chicago has commented that:

"The vibrancy and scale of Butler's work really captivates viewers, and once they are pulled in, they experience an often startling realization regarding materiality; that is, they discover what they are looking at is fabric rather than paint."

Along with being a practicing artist, Butler taught art in the Newark Public Schools for over a decade. She lives and works in Brooklyn, New York.

== Artistry ==
Don't Tread on Me, God Damn, Let's Go! - The Harlem Hellfighters (2021) by Bisa Butler at the Renwick Gallery in 2022

Patternmaster (2023), is a portrait of Octavia E. Butler on display in the National Portrait Gallery

Through her quilts, Butler aims to "tell stories that may have been forgotten over time." Butler often uses kente cloth and African wax printed fabrics in her quilts, so her subjects are "adorned with and made up of the cloth of our ancestors."

Butler's quilts both heavily incorporate African textiles a well as expand on a rich African American quilting tradition. She has also been inspired by the figurative textile works of Faith Ringgold. She explains in her artist statement:

"African Americans have been quilting since we were brought to this country and needed to keep warm. Enslaved people were not given large pieces of fabric and had to make do with the scraps of cloth that were left after clothing wore out. From these scraps the African American quilt aesthetic came into being....My own pieces are reminiscent of this tradition, but I use African fabrics from my father's homeland of Ghana, batiks from Nigeria, and prints from South Africa."

Butler typically works in bright jewel tones rather than representational colors to depict skin tone. Color serves to convey the emotions of the individuals in her quilts rather than their actual complexions. Using the Kool-Aid colors of the Black Power art movement also serves to capture the "soul and energy" of the person Butler is depicting. While at Howard, Butler was mentored by members of AfriCOBRA. The artist collective's bright, colorful aesthetic and aim to create positive representations of Black Americans can be found in Butler's body of work, as well.

Her quilts often feature portraits of famous figures in Black history, such as Paul Laurence Dunbar, Jackie Robinson, and Frederick Douglass,. Butler uses a variety of patterned fabrics, which she carefully selects to reflect the subject's life, sometimes using clothing worn by the subject. Her portrait of Nina Simone, for example, is made of cotton, silk, velvet, and netting, whereas her portrait of Jean-Michel Basquiat is made of leather, cotton, and vintage denim.

Along with her portraits of notable figures, Butler also creates pieces featuring everyday, unknown African American subjects that she bases on found photographs. She describes her fascination for her nameless subjects' unknown stories: "I feel these people; I know these stories because I have grown up with them my whole life." She strives "to bring as many of these unnamed peoples photos to the forefront" so "people will see these ordinary folks as deserving of a spotlight too." Her pieces are done in life scale in order "to invite the viewer to engage in dialogue--most figures look the viewers directly in their eyes."

Her work, Harlem Hellfighters, was acquired by the Smithsonian American Art Museum as part of the Renwick Gallery's 50th Anniversary Campaign. This work is Butler's largest quilt to date, measuring approximately 11 x 13 feet, and features nine life-sized figures. The photograph Butler used for this work is a 1919 black and white photograph of the 369th Infantry Regiment, nicknamed the Harlem Hellfighters, from World War I. Butler says, "My work is to continue to lift them up in history so they can be seen in public spaces, where their heroic sacrifices become part of the American quest to fight against oppression and for freedom."

In 2021, the Pérez Art Museum Miami acquired her work Black is King as part of the institution's new acquisitions initiative.

Butler has worked on commission to create a number of magazine covers, including the Fall 2020 cover of Juxtapoz, the March 2020 cover of Time Magazine honoring Wangari Maathai, the 2020 Time magazine "Person of the Year" image of Porche Bennett-Bey and the May/June 2021 edition of Essence magazine. Tarana Burke's memoir sports a cover image quilted by Butler. Additionally, Oprah Winfrey Network (OWN)'s included Butler's work in its "Juneteenth Artist Showcase".

== Exhibitions ==
As part of The Kinsey African American Art & History Collection, Butler's work has been exhibited at the Smithsonian Museum of American History, the Epcot Center, the National Underground Railroad Freedom Center, and other national and international venues.

In 2018, Butler exhibited at EXPO Chicago and was praised in Newcity and the Chicago Reader. In February 2019, her work was included along with that of Romare Bearden in The Art of Jazz, a Black History Month exhibition in Morristown, New Jersey. Butler's quilts are featured in art books such as Journey of Hope: Quilts Inspired by President Barack Obama (2010) and Collaborations: Two Decades of African American Art : Hearne Fine Art 1988-2008 (2008),. In 2019, she was a finalist for the Museum of Art and Design's Burke Prize.

Butler's first solo museum exhibition Bisa Butler: Portraits was co-organized between the Art Institute of Chicago and the Katonah Museum of Art. It was scheduled to first open at the Katonah Museum of Art from March 15 to June 14, 2020; however, after temporarily closing due to the COVID-19 pandemic, the exhibition was extended to October 4, 2020.

From May 13, 2022 to April 2, 2023, Butler's quilt Harlem Hellfighters was showcased in the Renwick Gallery's exhibition This Present Moment: Crafting a Better World which showcased the dynamic landscape of American craft today.

From November 17, 2022 to March 12, 2023, the Skirball Cultural Center presented Fabric of a Nation: American Quilt Stories, an exhibition with works by more than forty artists, including Bisa Butler.

From May 6, 2023 to June 30, 2023, Jeffrey Deitch Gallery presented Butler's quilt exhibition: The World Is Yours.

== Public collections ==
- 21c Museum of Art, Louisville, Kentucky
- Art Institute of Chicago, Chicago, Illinois
- Fine Arts Museums of San Francisco (FAMSF), San Francisco, California
- Kemper Museum of Contemporary Art, Kansas City, Missouri
- Minneapolis Institute of Art, Minneapolis, Minnesota
- Mount Holyoke Art Museum, Hadley, Massachusetts
- Museum of Arts and Design, New York
- Museum of Fine Arts, Boston, Massachusetts
- Nelson-Atkins Museum of Art, Kansas City, Missouri
- Newark Museum of Art, Newark, New Jersey
- Orlando Museum of Art, Orlando, Florida
- Pérez Art Museum Miami, Miami, Florida
- Smithsonian American Art Museum
- Smithsonian's National Museum of African American History and Culture, Washington, D.C.
- Toledo Museum of Art, Toledo, Ohio

== See also ==
- Diedrick Brackens
- Sheila Hicks
- Michael James
- Carolyn L. Mazloomi
- Faith Ringgold
- Stephen Towns
