= Jane Sauer =

American fiber artist (b. 1937)

- Born: Jane Gottlieb; September 16, 1937 (age 88); St. Louis, Missouri, United States
- Other name: Jane Gottlieb Sauer
- Education: Washington University in St. Louis
- Occupations: Visual artist, educator, gallerist
- Known for: Fiber art, sculpture
- Movement: American studio craft
- Spouse: Donald Carl Sauer (m. 1972–present)
- Awards: American Craft Council (2002 fellow)

Jane Gottlieb Sauer (born 1937) is an American fiber artist, sculptor, gallerist, and educator. She is known for her abstract waxed linen sculptures, sometimes referred to as "closed baskets". Saur founded the Textile Art Alliance; and formerly owned the Jane Sauer Gallery (2005–2013) in Santa Fe, New Mexico.

== Early life, family, and education ==
Jane Gottlieb was born September 16, 1937 in St. Louis, Missouri. She attended Washington University in St. Louis, and graduated with a B.F.A. degree (1959).

She married Donald Carl Sauer in 1972. She worked as a public school teacher for twelve years. In the late 1990s, she moved to New Mexico.

== Career ==
She focused on painting in her early career, and shifted to fiber art. She was influenced to work in fiber by the book, Beyond Craft: The Art of Fabric (1974) by Jack Lenor Larsen and Mildred Constantine.

Sauer has won many awards for her waxed linen sculptures, which are constructed with a knotting technique and finished with painting. Her works of the 1980s and 1990s display uninhibited emotion; and according to the book Makers: A History of American Studio Craft (2010) Sauer's work is one of the best examples emotionally charged American studio craft of that time period, similarly to Norma Minkowitz.

Sauer had a retrospective exhibition, "Jane Sauer: Impassioned Form" (2001), at the Robert Hillestad Textiles Gallery at University of Nebraska–Lincoln in Lincoln, Nebraska. Other notable exhibitions include "Current Exhibition: Jane Sauer" (1988) at the St. Louis Art Museum; and the traveling group exhibition, "The Tactile Vessel: New Basket Forms" (1989–1991) at the American Craft Museum (1989, now the Museum of Arts and Design); and the Erie Art Museum.

Sauer was the gallery director at Thirteen Moons Gallery in Santa Fe, New Mexico; and took over the management in 2005. She founded the "Jane Sauer Gallery" in the former Thirteen Moons Gallery space, which focused on fine art and crafts and was active from 2005 until 2013. The gallery was sold in 2013, and the name was Tansey Contemporary until 2017.

Her work is found in public museum collections, including the Museum of Fine Arts, Houston, Philadelphia Museum of Art, the Kemper Art Museum, the Cleveland Museum of Art, Museum of Fine Arts, Boston, and the Smithsonian American Art Museum.

== Awards and honors ==
Sauer was a National Endowment for the Arts (NEA) fellow in 1984. In 2002, Sauer was elected a fellow of the American Craft Council (ACC); and in 2019, she was awarded the lifetime achievement award from the National Basketry Organization (NBO).
