= Anne Newdigate =

Anne Newdigate may refer to:

- Anne Seymour, Duchess of Somerset (1497–1587), who married Francis Newdigate
- Anne Newdigate (1574–1618), gentlewoman and letter writer
- Ann Newdigate, Canadian artist
