= Mary Giles =

American fiber artist

- Born: Mary Jo Mortenson; May 15, 1944; St. Paul, Minnesota
- Died: April 11, 2018 (aged 73); Stillwater, Minnesota
- Known for: fiber artist

Mary Giles (1944–2018) was an American fiber artist.

== Biography ==
Giles née Mortenson was born on May 15, 1944, in St. Paul, Minnesota. She attended Mankato State University and attended various workshops led by Ferne Jacobs, Lissa Hunter, and Diane Itter. Giles had a career as an art teacher, retiring in the 1990s. She then turned her full attention creating fiber arts.

in 2013 Giles received the James Renwick Alliance Master of the Medium Award in Fiber. In 2015 the Textile Center of Minnesota held a retrospective of her work. She died on April 11, 2018, in Stillwater, Minnesota. Her work is in the collection of the Minneapolis Institute of Art and the Racine Art Museum.

Her work, Metallic Horizon, was acquired by the Smithsonian American Art Museum as part of the Renwick Gallery's 50th Anniversary Campaign.
