= Alicja Kozłowska =

Polish mixed media and textile artist

Alicja (Alic:e) Kozłowska
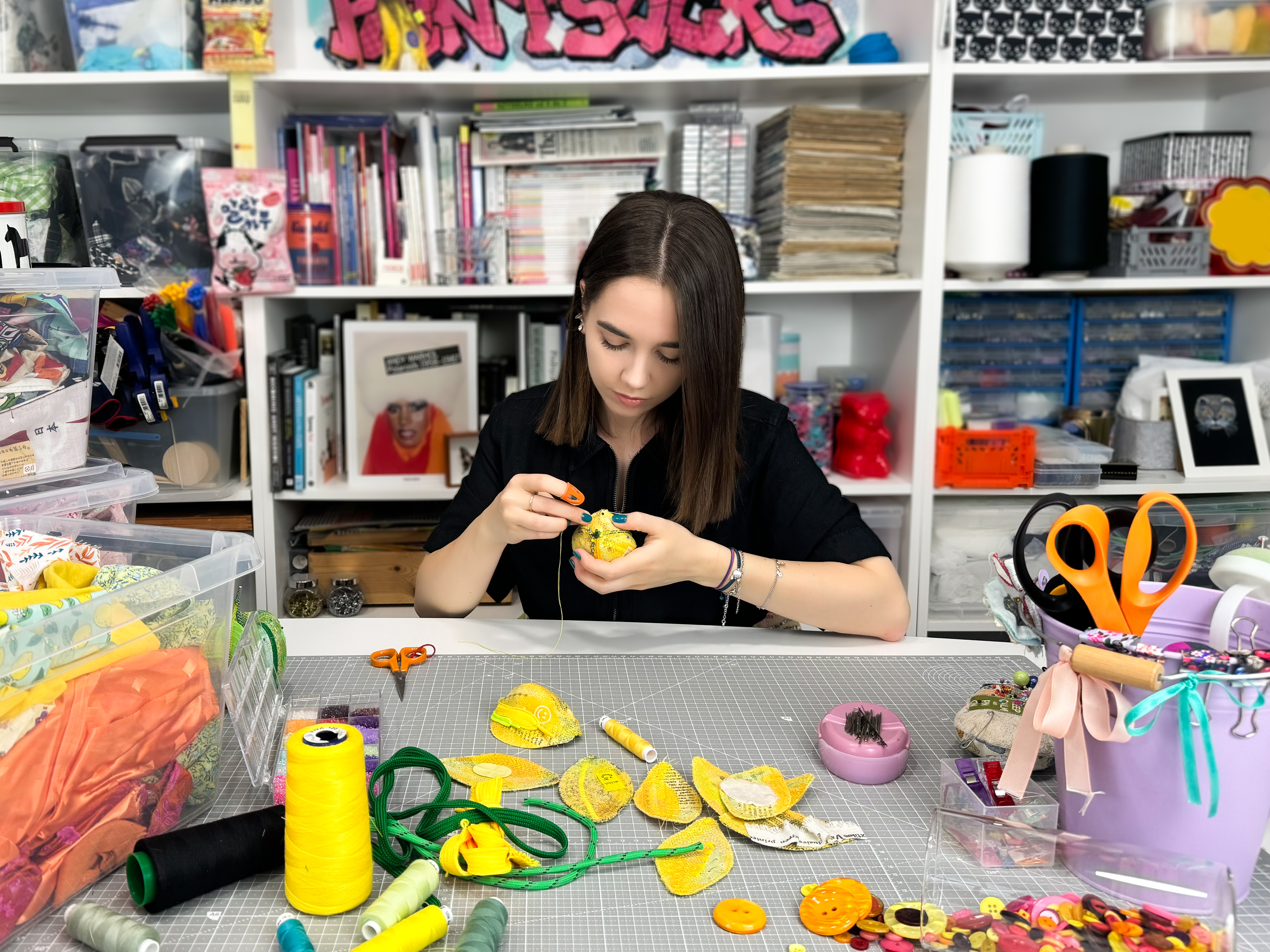
- Born: 2000 (age 25–26)
- Known for: Textile arts, Fiber art, Soft sculpture, Performances, Mixed media, Contemporary art
- Style: Pop art
- Awards: Hand & Lock Prize for Embroidery 2021
- Website: alicesidea.com

Alicja (Alic:e) Kozłowska (born in 2000.) is a contemporary Polish mixed media and textile artist.

She works mainly with felt, creating three-dimensional embroidered felt sculptures of everyday objects drawing inspiration from the reality that surrounds her and consumerism. Alice's work is deeply influenced by Andy Warhol and Pop art. She is trying to popularize Fiber Art and embroidery as a modern art medium.

Her work is exhibited in galleries and museums across Europe and United States, among others in: The LAM museum, Danubiana Meulensteen Art Museum, Pesti Vigadó gallery, MOCAK Museum Of Contemporary Art in Cracow, Unit London, The Valtopina Embroidery and Textile Museum, Bargehouse/ OXO Tower Wharf, Palazzo Velli Expo.
