= Mary Balzer Buskirk =

American fiber artist

- Born: March 11, 1931; Mountain Lake, Minnesota, U.S.
- Died: May 11, 2009 (aged 78); Monterey, California, U.S.
- Known for: Textile art

Mary Balzer Buskirk (1931 – 2009) was an American textile artist known for being part of the Mid-century modern movement creating fiber art outside the applied textile tradition.

Buskirk was born on March 11, 1931, in Mountain Lake, Minnesota. She earned her Bachelor of Arts degree from Carleton College and her Master of Fine Arts from the Cranbrook Academy of Art. In 2001 the Monterey Museum of Art held a retrospective entitled The Fabric of Experience: the woven art of Mary Balzer Buskirk.

Buskirk died in Monterey, California, on May 11, 2009. Her work is in the collection of the Monterey Museum of Art the San Jose Museum of Quilts & Textiles, the Museum of Art and Design, among other venues.
