= Colleen Heslin =

Canadian artist

- Born: 1976 (age 49–50); Toronto, Ontario
- Education: Emily Carr University of Art and Design, Concordia University
- Known for: Mixed-Media works
- Website: http://www.colleenheslin.com/

Colleen Heslin (born 1976) is a Canadian mixed-media artist based in Vancouver, Canada. Heslin works predominantly with textiles and quilting to create an abstract compositions.

== Personal life ==
Heslin was born in Toronto, Ontario and raised in London, Ontario. She graduated from the Emily Carr University of Art and Design in 2003 with a Bachelor of Fine Arts in photography and in 2014 she graduated with a Master of Fine Arts from Concordia University in painting and drawing.

== Career ==
As a young artist Heslin established The Crying Room (1999–2014), a rented retail unit on Cordova Street and Main Street in Vancouver which she used as an exhibition space of other local artists' works. Her artist-run space became a venue for many new and emerging artists and placed an emphasis on equal exposure for female and male artists. A large focus on community can also be seen at Heslin's Crying Room in "The Writing on the Wall" project, which was a twenty-two-week public art project in 2011 exhibited outside the front of the gallery, as well as the "Chalkboard" project in 2003, also in front of the gallery. Under the gallery's operations Heslin facilitated several interviews with the exhibited artists on topics such as their inspiration, media, and style. Heslin also completed several residencies in North America and Europe including in Saskatchewan, Vevey, Berlin, Malcolm Island, and Joshua Tree between the years 2011–2016. She is represented by Monte Clark Gallery.

=== RBC Canadian Painting Contest ===
On October 2, 2013, Heslin was announced as the winner of the 15th Annual Royal Bank of Canada's (RBC) Canadian Painting Competition for her painting titled Almost Young and Wild and Free. The winning painting incorporated several large swaths of fabric in bright hues of blue, gold and magenta and has a tromp l'oeil three-dimensional effect. She was praised for her "fresh approach to a traditional medium" with her usage of textiles and craft work. For her first-place finish, Heslin received $25,000 and her piece was added to RBC's private art collection. Runners-up in the competition were Colin Muir Doward and Neil Harrison.

== Style and works ==
Heslin's textile series of paintings uses hand-dyed, previously owned domestic fabrics (i.e. bed sheets, clothing) which are hung to dry in bunches which result in a three-dimensional tromp-l'oeil effect on the fabrics. Heslin sews abstract fabric shapes together in a process similar to quilting and then stretches the "abstract collage of cottons and linens" together around a frame. She developed this style around 2010 when she started to keep off-cuts of paintings for studies for future works. In her painting, Chain of Command (2016), the washed-out grey panels suspend eight colourful, abstract shapes that have no obvious pattern or rhythm. The colourful, almost geometric, shapes do not directly border one another and they spread out to fill the entirety of the frame. Her paintings vary in their colour palette but seem to either be dominated by a greyscale palette or a blend of rich colours. The titles of her works "reflect a gesture within the work" and suggest a "landscapes of figures." The result has been compared to modernist abstract expressionist paintings of the 1960s and 1970s, specifically with the Colour Field painters.

=== Influences ===
Heslin has previously stated she drew inspiration from artists such as Sonia Delaunay. There are many similarities between Delaunay's 1911 patchwork quilt and Heslin's paintings in the brightly coloured bits of fabric sewn together. Art critics have compared Heslin's style to other modernist artists, and identified similarities to Jack Bush, Dan Christensen, William Perehudoff, and Helen Frankenthaler for their use of large abstract shapes in bright colours.

=== Critical reception ===
Heslin's use of traditional craft work in her textiles and needlework is often linked to discussions on feminism in labour and art, an element explored by several second wave feminist artists like Judy Chicago in "Dinner Party". Toronto's Globe and Mail newspaper compares Heslin's works to Matisse's paper cutouts and to Ludwig Sander's oil panels and describes her work as "the domestication or 'feminization' of the Colour Field machismo." Heslin's use of secondhand materials has been viewed as a comment on consumer excess.

== Select exhibitions ==
- Avant que je ne change d'avis, with Les Ramsay, RATS Collective, Vevey, Switzerland (2013)
- Slow Down, Get Lost, with Les Ramsay, Kinderhook & Caracas, Berlin Germany (2013)
- Ballads from the North Sea, Laroche/Joncas (2014)
- Outcasts and Shady Trees, Monte Clark Gallery, (2014)
- Treading Bouylines (solo), Charles, H. Scott Gallery (2015)
- Walking and Falling: Colleen Heslin and Vanessa Brown, ESP, Toronto (2015)
- Needles and Pins, (solo) The Esker Foundation, (2016)
- Vancouver Special: Ambivalent Pleasures, Vancouver Art Gallery (2016)
- Colleen Heslin: Needles and Pins (solo), McMichael Canadian Art Collection (June 4, 2016 – February 20, 2017)
- Entangled: Two Views on Contemporary Canadian Painting, Vancouver Art Gallery (2017–2018)
- Beginning with the Seventies: GLUT, Morris and Helen Belkin Art Gallery (2018)
- The Other Side: Artworks from RBC Canadian Painting Competition Alumni, The Power Plant, Toronto (2018)
- Shelter from the storm, Patel Brown, Toronto (2026)
