= Dominic Di Mare =

American artist (born 1932)

- Born: 1932 (age 93–94); San Francisco, California, US
- Education: San Francisco State University
- Known for: abstract sculpture, fiber art

Dominic L. Di Mare (born 1932) is an American artist and craftsperson, known for his weaving, abstract mixed-media sculpture, watercolor paintings, cast paper art, and fiber art. His work touches on themes of personal spirituality. He is based in Tiburon, California.

== Biography ==
Dominic Di Mare was born in 1932 in San Francisco, California. He grew up in Monterey, California where his Sicilian-born father owned a fishing boat. He was primarily a self taught artist, however he had taken classes at San Francisco State University (SFSU) and summer classes at California College of the Arts (formally known as California College of Arts and Crafts). He learned about weaving while at SFSU, and he taught himself how to weave by studying photos of Kay Sekimachi woven wall hanging in Craft Horizons magazine.

He had his first art exhibition in the early 1960s in San Francisco. In the mid-1960s, he was a junior high school art teacher while creating his work. He taught in the public school system for 17 years. In the 1970s he began making handmade rag papers, often incorporating things you may find on a beach like feathers. Dominic Di Mare had a few retrospective exhibitions including at Palo Alto Art Center (formally called the Palo Alto Cultural Center) in 1997, Dominic Di Mare: A Retrospective at Renwick Gallery of the National Museum of American Art in 1999, and Anchors in Time: Dominic Di Mare at the San Francisco Museum of Craft and Design in 2018.

He was awarded the American Craft Council's Gold Medal in 1999.

His work is included in various public museum collections including the Metropolitan Museum of Art, Centraal Museum, Fine Arts Museums of San Francisco (FAMSF), Smithsonian American Art Museum, Oakland Museum of California, Minneapolis Institute of Art, the Museum of Fine Arts, Houston, Memphis Brooks Museum of Art, and others.
