= Rodrigo Franzão =

Brazilian artist

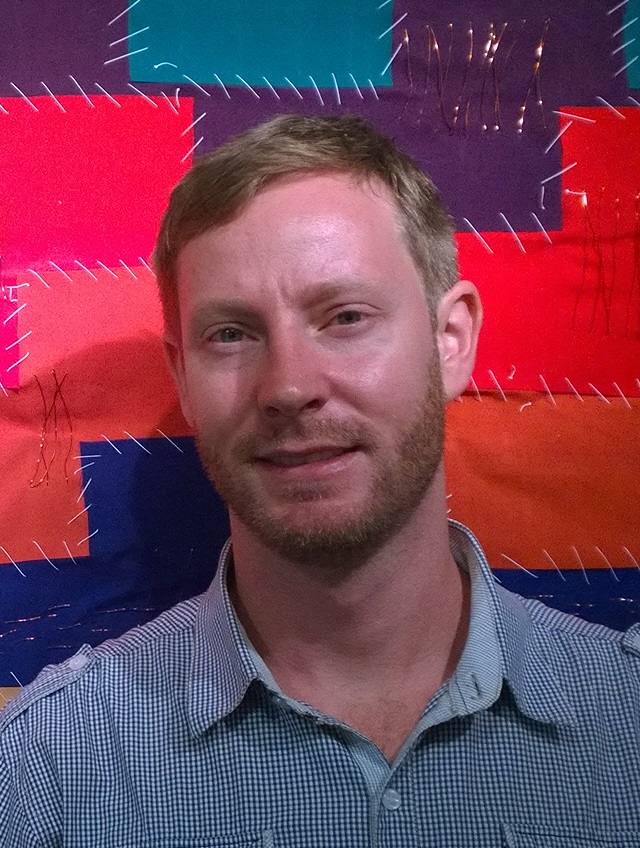
- Franzão in 2015
- Born: April 27, 1982 (age 43); São Paulo, Brazil
- Education: University of Sao Marcos, Paulista College of Arts, University Center Claretiano
- Known for: Textile arts, Fiber art, Installation art, Painting, Mixed media
- Movement: Contemporary art
- Website: rodrigofranzao.com Founder of Museu Têxtil museutextil.com

Rodrigo Franzão (born April 27, 1982) is a contemporary Brazilian mixed media and textile artist. He works mainly with textile, copper wire, needle, thread, vinyl poliacetate, oil and acrylic, creating and shaping geometric forms. Franzão currently lives and works in the town of São Paulo in the state of São Paulo, Brazil.

== Early life and education ==
Between 2002 and 2004, Rodrigo Franzão studied Language Arts at the University of São Marcos. During this time, he learned concrete poetry in Brazilian literature classes, which reinforced his interest for geometric abstraction. After graduating in Language Arts, Franzão taught Portuguese language and Brazilian literature for nearly a decade. During this time, he had the opportunity to combine art into his classes. Soon after that the evolution of his artistic process begun to unfold. Between 2008 and 2011, he enrolls in Psychopedagogy, Art Therapy and in Communication Art education classes at the Paulista College of Arts. At the same time, his evolution as an artist distinctly manifested itself during his tenure at the College of Architecture and Urbanism at the United Metropolitan College (2011) which emphasized spatial organization and visual communication. In order to put this theoretical knowledge into practice, in 2013 he goes further by enrolling in art college at the University Center Claretiano in Brasilia, Brazil, to gain a greater understanding of the historical, social and aesthetic context of art.

== Work ==
Rodrigo Franzão is influenced by geometric abstraction and constructivist art. He expresses himself with the aim of revealing the transparency that exists through the use of every day materials. Through multiple languages he interweaves mixed media to show the minutiae and structure that fragment into dispersion, gap and sound. After graduating in Psychpedagogy and Art Therapy, he started to find inspiration in almost everything that surrounds the human universe and to assimilate the way humans interact with their own repertoire. He combines two-dimensional and three-dimensional effects, creating a relationship of dependency between both. Besides geometric abstraction, bright colors are used in his artworks to harmonize the contrast between the shape and colors.

== Influences ==
His inspirations are the works by Eva Hesse, Josef Albers, Kansuke Yamamoto, Sheila Hicks, Paolo Scheggi, Lucio Fontana, Turi Simeti, Roberto Burle Marx.

== Exhibitions ==
Rodrigo Franzão exhibited his first series of works entitled Involuntary Exclusion at Anexxo Gallery in Brazil. Utilizing fabric, needles and copper wire, Franzão's idea was to establish the dialogue that an individual plays between what it means to live and become a visible and active member of society through the act of becoming a consumer, and through that concealing his true essence. The following year, he presents this same series of works in the Supreme Court Museum in Brasília, a public museum with the architecture by Oscar Niemeyer. In the same year, Rodrigo Franzão introduces its new series of works in the National Arts Club in New York City, private club founded in 1898 by Charles DeKay, an art and literary critic of the New York Times to "stimulate, foster, and promote public interest in the arts and to educate the American people in the fine arts". The Exhibit titled "Katharsis" presents works inspired in the human body, showing at first plan the structures that sustain all the biological condition in the human being. Through a plan of observation, Franzão suggests in his work the harmony between geometry and figurative forms leading the observer to come across their own reality. About the artists and the series Katharsis, Robert Yahner, the curator of the exhibition, says "Franzão is one of the most dynamic and provocative artists among Brazil's new generation of talent. Enlightened by an early background in Literature and Communications, the work of Rodrigo Franzão reveals an incantatory discourse between the artist, his vision and his uninhibited involvement with found materials. KATHARSIS transforms this dialogue into an exploration of the human form moving from aspects of beauty to biological condition. The grounding force of Franzão's line combined with the vibrant play of geometric abstraction gives KATHARSIS a rhythmic power. The work is further enhanced by the artist's facile use of mixed media and a brilliant sense of color - an echoing pulse of his native country."

== Collections ==
Rodrigo Franzão has two works in public collections. They can be visited at the Supreme Court Museum in Brasília.

== Bibliography ==
- "The National Arts Club presents Rodrigo Franzão - Katharsis". NYC.COM | New York's Box Office. October 2015:1. Web. (USA)
- "Celebridades e artistas em coquetel da exposição de Rodrigo Franzão". Artistas e Artes. October 2015:1. Web. (Brazil)
- "The National Arts Club presents Rodrigo Franzão - Katharsis". Guest of a guest. September 2015:1. Web. (USA)
- Calderón-Douglass, Barbara. "3 Can't Miss Art Exhibits This Week". Remezda. September 2015:1. Web. (USA)
- "Artista de Goiás é o 1º brasileiro a expor em famosa galeria dos EUA. Telas de Rodrigo Franzão vão ficar em local que já teve obras de Picasso". G1 - Globo TV. September 2015:1. Web. (Brazil)
- "Rodrigo Franzão abre sua exposição dia 29 de setembro no National Arts Club". Manchete Online. September 2015:1. Web. (Brazil)
- "Rodrigo Franzão é o primeiro brasileiro a expor na Marquis Galeria em 117 anos: O espaço recebe dez obras do artista paulistano". Revista Brasileiros. September 2015:1. Web. (Brazil)
- Santana, Paula. "Do Brasil para o Mundo". GPS Brasília. September 2015:1. Web. (Brazil)
- "Gallery Calendar". National Arts Club, September 2015:1. Web. (USA)
- "Rodrigo Franzão é o primeiro artista plástico brasileiro, em 117 anos, a expor na Marquis Gallery do National Arts Club, em Nova York. Obras de Arte. September 2015:1. Web. (Brazil)
- Soares, Ana C. "Terraço Paulistano: SP-Abadiânia-NY" Veja São Paulo. August 2015:15. Print. (Brazil)
- Bennellick, Mary. "Abstract Textiles" Be Creative with Workbox. July–August 2015: 82–85. Print. (England)
- "The limit is imagination: Rodrigo Franzão on his abstract art". Arts Culture. July 2015:1. Web. (England)
- "Rodrigo Franzão. Textile Art". Zeroland. Website Gallery O. June 2015:1. Web. (USA)
- "Rodrigo Franzão". The Art Zine. Website Arts Culture. June 2015:1. Web. (Italy)
- "Rodrigo Franzão - Abadiânia, Goiás, Brazil". 365 days 365 artists. May 2015:1. Web. (USA)
- "Rodrigo Franzão: Subtração Involuntária". Vem Comigo TV. YouTube. May 2015. Video. (Brazil)
- Giusti, André. "Museu do Superior Tribunal de Justiça: entrevista". Museu do Superior Tribunal de Justiça. May 2015. Audio. (Brazil)
- "Subtração Involuntária chega à Brasília: Obras chegam com cores vibrantes e arranjos geométricos". Curta Mais +. May 2015:1. Web. (Brazil)
- "Com entrada gratuita, exposição Subtração Involuntária é inaugurada em Brasília". Brand Press. May 2015:1. Web. (Brazil)
- "Galerias e Escritórios de arte: Anexxo Galeria". Mapa das Artes. April 2015:1. Web. (Brazil)
- "Arte Têxtil". Cultura Osasco. Jan. 2015:1. Web. (Brazil)
- Pitcher, Sam. "Rodrigo Franzão: Abstract forms". Textile Artist. December 2014:1. Web. (London)
- Meusburger, Rose. "Artista plástico brasileiro é destaque em portal inglês da área têxtil". Gaia Brasil: Acreditamos na educação. December 2014:1. Web. (Brazil)
- Fernandes, Maria T. "Arte em Abadiânia". Revista Roteiro Brasília. October–November 2014:16. Print. (Brazil)
- Gomes, Eldo. "Acontece Goiás: Chega a Abadiânia (GO) a Anexxo Galeria". Acontece Brasília. October 2014:1. Web. (Brazil)
- "Destaque: Anexxo Galeria: Rodrigo Franzão. Abadiânia (GO). O Artista apresenta nove obras feitas com tecido, fio de cobre e agulhas, inspirads no consumismo". Mapa das Artes. October 2014:1. Web. (Brazil)
- "Galerias e Escritórios de Arte: Anexxo Galeria". Mapa das Artes. October 2014:1. Web. (Brazil)
