= Alice Kettle =

British artist

Alice Kettle (born 1961) is a British contemporary textile and fiber artist.

== Biography ==
Kettle was born in Winchester in Hampshire and studied fine art at the University of Reading from 1979 to 1984 before taking the postgraduate diploma course in textile art at Goldsmiths College during 1985 and 1986. She subsequently received a series of grants and artist-in-residence awards, notably at the Canberra School of Art in Australia, and also took several part-time and visiting teaching posts. Kettle is currently a professor in Textile Arts at Manchester School of Art at Manchester Metropolitan University.

Kettle's work is focused upon stitched textiles, and explores themes of cultural heritage, journeys and displacement. Her stitched works, many the size of huge figurative tapestries, exploit the textures and effects made possible through the harnessing of a mechanical process to intuitive and creative ends.

Her work is represented in various public collections such as the Crafts Council in London, the Whitworth Art Gallery in Manchester, the Museo Internationale delle Arti Applicate Oggi in Turin, Italy. Commissions by Kettle include works for the National Library of Australia in 1999, plus a work for the School of Music & Drama at the University of Manchester. Other public works by Kettle include:

- a 1994 altar front for the Holy Sepulchre Chapel at Winchester Cathedral,
- Glimpses of India, 1994–1995, for the cruise ship, MV Oriana
- In Camera, 1995–1997, for the Scottish High Court in Edinburgh,
- three altar pieces, 1999–2001, for Gloucester Cathedral.
