= Eve Peri =

American textile artist (1897–1966)

- Born: September 25, 1897; Bangor, Maine
- Died: March 4, 1966 (aged 68)
- Known for: Fiber art

Eve Peri (1897–1966) was a textile artist known for her embroidery, appliqué, and "fiber forms".

== Biography ==
Peri was born on September 25, 1897, in Bangor, Maine. She traveled extensively in Europe and South and Central America. She studied techniques and collected fabrics.

Peri was married several times. Her second husband was Rafael Alfonso Umaña Mendez (1908–1994), a Colombian born artist. The couple produced handwoven material that they sold in New York under the name Peri-Umaña.

In the early 1940s Peri began creating her "fabric forms", panels which combined embroidery and applique.

Peri died on March 4, 1966.

Her work is in the collections of the Art Institute of Chicago, the Cooper Hewitt, Smithsonian Design Museum, the Farnsworth Art Museum, and the Smithsonian American Art Museum.

In 1996 the Albin O. Kuhn Library & Gallery in Baltimore held a retrospective exhibit entitled Eve Peri: A Modernist Spirit.
