= Rafael Alfonso Umaña Mendez =

Colombian-born American artist (1908–1994)

- Born: 1908
- Died: 1994 (aged 85–86)

Alfonso Umana, Hooked Rug (detail) watercolor, c. 1938, Index of American Design, National Gallery of Art, Washington, DC.

Rafael Alfonso Umaña Mendez (1908–1994) was a Colombian-born American artist.

Umaña created illustrations for the Index of American Design. These illustrations are part of the collection in the National Gallery of Art. For a time he was married to the textile artist, Eve Peri (1897–1966). The couple collaborated on projects under the name Peri-Umana.

His work is in the collection of the Metropolitan Museum of Art.
