= Diane Itter =

American fiber artist

- Born: 1946; Summit, New Jersey
- Died: 1989 (aged 42–43); Bloomington, Indiana
- Known for: fiber artist
- Spouse: William Itter

'Evolutionary Phases', linen work by Diane Itter, 1979, 12 1/4 inches, Metropolitan Museum of Art

Diane Itter (4 October 1946 – 12 October 1989) was an American fiber artist. Her work emerged from the 1960s renaissance of interest in fiber art.

== Life ==
While studying at the University of Pittsburgh, she met her future husband, artist William Itter, who encouraged her to experiment with hand-tied knots. Itter used fine threads, small knots, and bright colors, whereas most fiber artists working at the time were producing large sculptural works from undyed fibers tied into large knots. Itter was inspired by historical textiles from Peru, Japan, and Africa.

Itter had limited herself to brightly dyed thread and a single type of knot by 1974. Each work took her about one and one-half weeks of 8 to 10 hour workdays. In 1981, she developed carpal-tunnel syndrome. She slept with splints on her wrists, but continued to produce 20 to 30 intricate pieces annually, while continuing her teaching and lecturing schedule. She died from cancer in 1989.
