= Ann Newdigate =

South African-born Canadian artist (1931–2023)

Ann Newdigate (August 17, 1934 – December 13, 2023) was a South African-born Canadian fibre artist who worked primarily in tapestries.

== Early life and education ==
Newdigate was born in Grahamstown, South Africa and received a BA in African Studies and English Literature from the University of Cape Town. She came to Canada in 1966. She received a BFA and a MFA from the University of Saskatchewan. She pursued post-graduate studies in tapestry at the Edinburgh College of Art.

== Career ==
From 1982 to 1987, Newdigate taught drawing, design and art education at the University of Saskatchewan. She also taught drawing and initiated the tapestry course in the fine arts program at Monash University as a visiting fellow. From 1992 to 1995, Newdigate served on the Saskatchewan Arts Board. She lived on Hornby Island in British Columbia.

Newdigate contributed the essay "Kinda art, sorta tapestry" to the anthology New feminist art criticism: critical strategies.

Newdigate's 1984 tapestry Creatures of Habit, purchased by the Government of Canada, was mistakenly placed in the lost and found at Montréal–Mirabel International Airport and sold at auction.

Newdigate's art has appeared in exhibitions across Canada and in the United States and Australia. Her work is included in the collections of the Canada Council Art Bank, the Canadian Museum of History, the MacKenzie Art Gallery in Regina, Saskatchewan, the City of Regina, the City of Ottawa, the Burnaby Art Gallery, the Art Gallery of Greater Victoria, the Remai Modern, and the Toronto Dominion Bank in Edmonton, Alberta.

== Personal life and death ==
Newdigate was married to John Aitken Mills, who died in 2012. She died on December 13, 2023, at the age of 89.
