= Carole Frances Lung =

American artist and activist

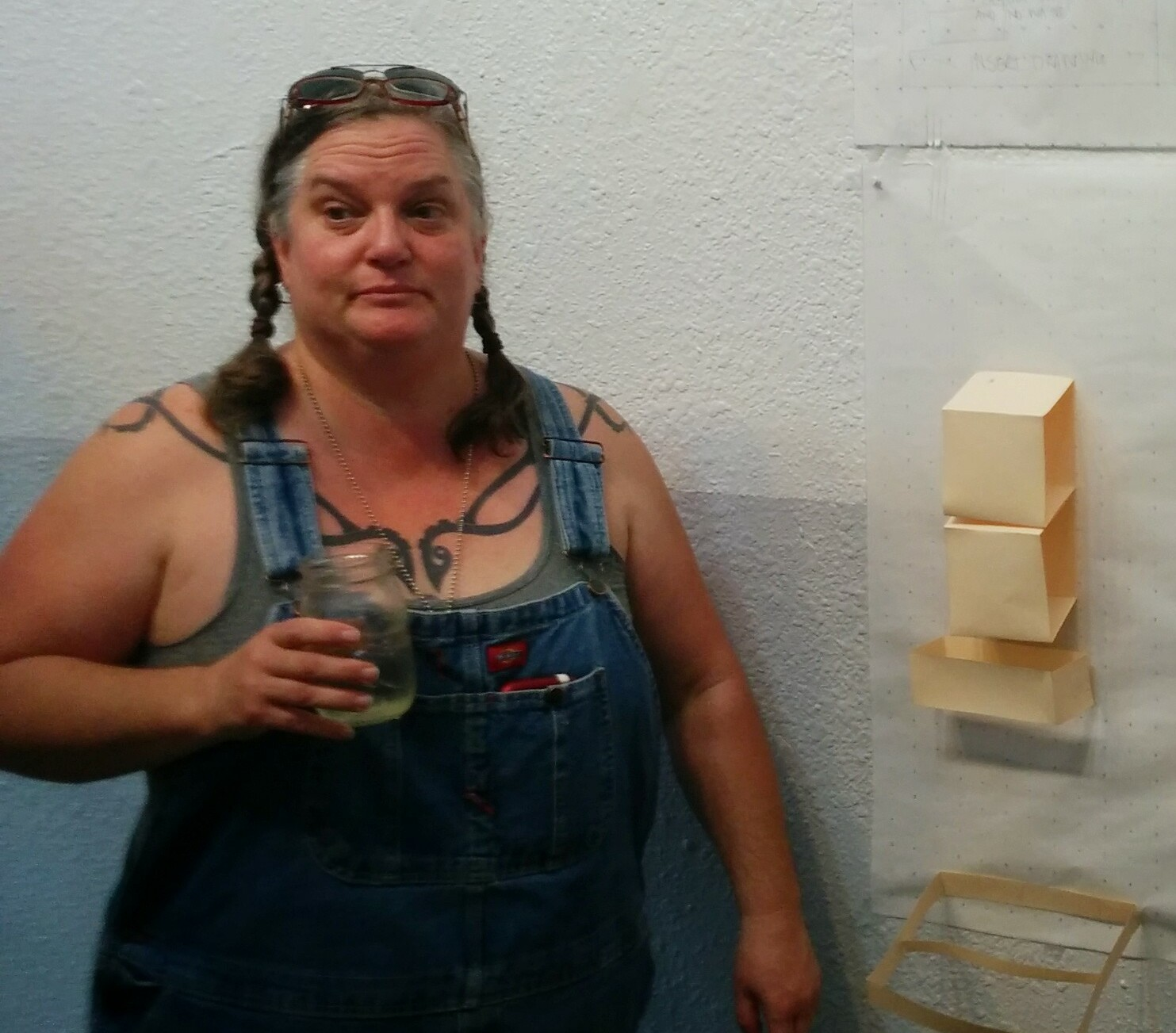
- Lung in her studio in 2015
- Born: 1966 (age 59–60)
- Education: 2007 MFA / 2005 BFA Fiber and Material Studies, School of the Art Institute of Chicago 2006 Semester Study Abroad, Public Art/ New Artistic Strategies, Bauhaus University, Weimar Germany 1988 Bachelor of Science, Textiles and Clothing, North Dakota State University, Fargo ND
- Occupations: Artist, labor activist

Carole Frances Lung (born 1966) is an American artist and labor activist, known for her performance art which centers around subjects such as textile consumption, unfair labor practices, and production systems. Lung is an associate professor of Fashion Fiber and Materials at California State University, Los Angeles. Her work concerns labor in the fashion industry and often comprises long-duration projects of performance art and collaborative art activism. She is based in Long Beach, California.

== Early life and education ==
Carole Frances Lung was born in 1966 in San Francisco, California. She was raised in Huntington Beach.

Lung received a Bachelor of Science degree in Textiles and Clothing from North Dakota State University in 1988. She moved to New York City to work in the fashion design industry. Lung studied Fiber and Material Studies at the School of the Art Institute of Chicago, receiving a BFA degree in 2005 and a MFA degree in 2007. During a 2006 semester abroad in Weimar, Germany, she studied Public Art and New Artistic Strategies at the Bauhaus University. There she engaged in her performance piece "One Size Fits All," sewing out of a storefront.

== Career ==
Carole Frances Lung has almost fifteen years of experience working in the garment industry. She uses her art as a form of activism which makes statements on various topics, such as mass production and consumption, and the value of thoughtfully made clothing.

Lung's project Sewing Rebellion has as its goal to break the mass-production cycle of consumer textiles, and involves teaching participants to make and repair clothing. Her project， Made in Haiti (2009-2012) was a collaboration with Haitian tailors to create an alternative to the mass globalized textile market.

Lung has also created performance art under the persona "Frau Fiber," an East German garment worker. Frau Fiber was born in Apolda, Germany in 1966 and worked in garment and machine knitting factories until the fall of the Berlin Wall. Frau Fiber takes inspiration from the folk character John Henry; knitting or sewing by hand against faster technology, knowing that ultimately she will fail.
