= Textile Society of America =

International non-profit educational organization

The Textile Society of America (TSA) was founded in 1987 as an international non-profit educational organization for sharing and disseminating information about textiles and fiber media. The society sponsors a bi-annual conference where juried papers are presented on artistic, cultural, economic, historic, social and technical perspectives on textiles from around the world. TSA additionally runs programs that include in person workshops, virtual forums, awards, and scholarships. The scholarships offered are aimed at lowering the financial barrier to in person research in the textiles space.

== History ==
Textile Society of America is a membership organization, governed by a volunteer board of directors from museums and universities in North America and administered by a small staff. Its approximately 700 members include curators, educators, historians, independent scholars, artists, journalists, students, dealers and collectors. Membership includes access to symposium proceedings along with a newsletter, membership directory and textile bibliography.

== See also ==
- Fiberworks Center for the Textile Arts
