= Stephen Towns =

African American artist (born 1980)

- Born: 1980 (age 45–46); Lincolnville, South Carolina
- Known for: contemporary art, mixed media art, craft, painting, quilt
- Notable work: An Offering
- Awards: Mary Sawyers Imboden Prize, Municipal Art Society of Baltimore Travel Prize
- Website: Official website

Stephen Towns, born in 1980 in Lincolnville, South Carolina, is an artist based in Baltimore, Maryland.

== Early life and education ==
Towns has been creating art since his childhood in Lincolnville, South Carolina, where he was the youngest of 11 siblings. He holds a Bachelor of Fine Arts in Painting from the University of South Carolina. He has pursued art professionally for nearly two decades.

Towns has held various jobs throughout his career, including positions in a factory, at IHOP, and in a hospital where he stocked surgical equipment for operating rooms and the Maryland Institute College of Art.

== Artistic themes ==
Using labor as a theme, Towns highlights the role that African Americans have played in the economy and explores their resilience, resistance, and endurance. His art has challenged the United States to truly embrace the tenets of its Declaration of Independence. Towns draw visual inspiration from Medieval altarpieces, impressionist paintings, and wax cloth prints. He works primarily with oil, acrylic, and fibers.

Towns finds photographs in archives of everyday people going about their lives, whether visiting a beauty parlor or in the Florida outdoors.

== Paintings and mixed media work ==
Stephen Towns' paintings explore the lives of individuals affected by American slavery, including the Zong massacre of 1781, in which 133 enslaved Africans were murdered by the crew of a British slave ship. His work also reflects on the resilience of those who survived the Middle Passage and highlights the significant role of African Americans in shaping the economy through their endurance and resistance.

One series, "Sunken," consists of portraits on paper inspired by Towns' research into the Zong massacre. These portraits serve as a testament to the resilience of Africans who survived the Middle Passage.

Towns' most acclaimed series, "An Offering," is part of the permanent collection at the Smithsonian National Museum of African American History and Culture in Washington, D.C. This series is influenced by Marcus Rediker’s 2007 book The Slave Ship: A Human History. The eight works in "An Offering" honor West Africans who were forcibly separated from their families and endured the Middle Passage. The shape of each piece is designed to resemble the diagram of the 18th-century British slave ship, the Brookes.

Stephen Towns' paintings have been a subject of controversy due to their depiction of sensitive historical subjects. His "Joy Cometh" series, which portrays realistic images of slave rebels, initially received praise at Galerie Myrtis but faced backlash at Goucher College's Rosenberg Gallery. An employee at the college found the paintings, which included images of Black faces with nooses, offensive and distressing, leading to a mediated discussion and a request for their removal. Towns, in response, chose to withdraw the paintings but left taped squares where they were originally displayed. His decision to remove the artwork, while seen as a gesture of sensitivity, also sparked a wide-ranging and contentious debate on social media about the representation of historical trauma and its impact on viewers.

== Quilts ==
In 2018, the Baltimore Museum of Art mounted a solo exhibition of his paintings and quilts. In this exhibition, Towns mixes color and form to transform ordinary shapes into extraordinary patterns. Towns' quilting work is viewed as a revival that dignifies forgotten individuals. Through color and composition, he reveals stories of those who have been overlooked and historically overlooked.

== Critical reception and awards ==
Towns' work has been featured in publications such as the New York Times, Artforum, the Washington Post, Hyperallergic, Cultured Magazine, AfroPunk, Hype Beast and the American Craft Council Magazine.

In 2016, Towns was honored with the Municipal Art Society of Baltimore Travel Prize. In 2021, he became the first Black artist-in-residence at the Fallingwater Institute and was also awarded the Maryland State Arts Council's Individual Artist Award.

The Greater Baltimore Cultural Alliance (GBCA) and the William G. Baker Jr. Memorial Fund announced Stephen Towns as one of the six 2024 Baker Artist Awardees, recipients of the $10,000 Mary Sawyers Baker Prize. From these six artists, Towns was selected to receive the 2024 Mary Sawyers Imboden Prize, which includes an additional $30,000 for a total of $40,000.

== Solo exhibitions ==
Towns has held the following solo exhibitions:

- Private Paradise: A Figurative Exploration of Black Rest and Recreation, The Rockwell Museum, Corning, New York.
- Stephen Towns, Declaration & Resistance, Westmoreland Museum of American Art, Greensburg, Pennsylvania.
- Rumination and a Reckoning, Baltimore Museum of Art, Baltimore, Maryland.

== Museum collections ==
Towns's work is held in the following permanent collections:

- Smithsonian National Museum of African American History and Culture, Washington, D.C.
- Baltimore Museum of Art, Baltimore, Maryland.
- Boise Museum of Art, Boise, Idaho.
- Flint Institute of Arts, Flint, Michigan.
- Huntington Museum of Art, Huntington, Wyoming.
- The National Portrait Gallery, Washington, D.C.
- The Nelson-Atkins Museum of Art, Kansas City, Missouri.
- Petrucci Family Foundation Collection of African American Art, Asbury, New Jersey.
- The Rockwell Museum, Corning, New York.
- Westmoreland Museum of American Art, Greensburg, Pennsylvania.
- Wichita Museum of Art, Wichita, Kansas.
