= Norma Minkowitz =

American fiber artist (born 1937)

- Born: 1937 (age 88–89); New York City, New York, U.S.
- Other names: Norma M. Minkowitz, Norma C. Minkowitz
- Education: Cooper Union
- Occupation: Fiber artist
- Known for: Crochet sculptures
- Height: 4 ft 11 in (150 cm)
- Awards: American Craft Council (2003 fellow)

Norma Minkowitz (born 1937, New York City) is an American visual artist. She is known for fiber art, including crochet sculptures. She is also an athlete, having set multiple world records in masters athletics.

== Artistic career ==
She attended Cooper Union. In 2003, she became fellow of the American Craft Council. In 2009, she received the Master of the Medium Award from the James Renwick Alliance.

Minkowitz's work is in the permanent collection of 35 museums, including the Denver Art Museum, the Metropolitan Museum of Art, the Minneapolis Institute of Art, and the Museum of Fine Arts Boston. Her piece, Goodbye, My Friend, was acquired by the Smithsonian American Art Museum as part of the Renwick Gallery's 50th Anniversary Campaign.

== Athletic career ==
Minkowitz began running seriously in her late forties, and competed in marathons in her fifties.

In 2023, she set the world record for women aged 85 through 89 (W85-89) 400 meter race, at 1:50.99. In 2024, she set the world record for the mile in the W85-89 category, completing the race in 9:46.65. Reflecting on her achievements, she said:

I’m not pessimistic, maybe I fear death. But I feel strong and healthy so it’s a weird combination. But there’s also hope in a lot of my work, like a burst of birds flying freely and things that have deep meaning, not laying down and dying but fighting for what you want. I think I fight for what I want in my running. I don’t know where this came from with my sedentary background, but I’ve always pushed myself to the limits.

— Norma Minkowitz, In an interview with Del Moon for the National Senior Games Association
