= Gyöngy Laky =

American Sculptor

Gyongy Laky
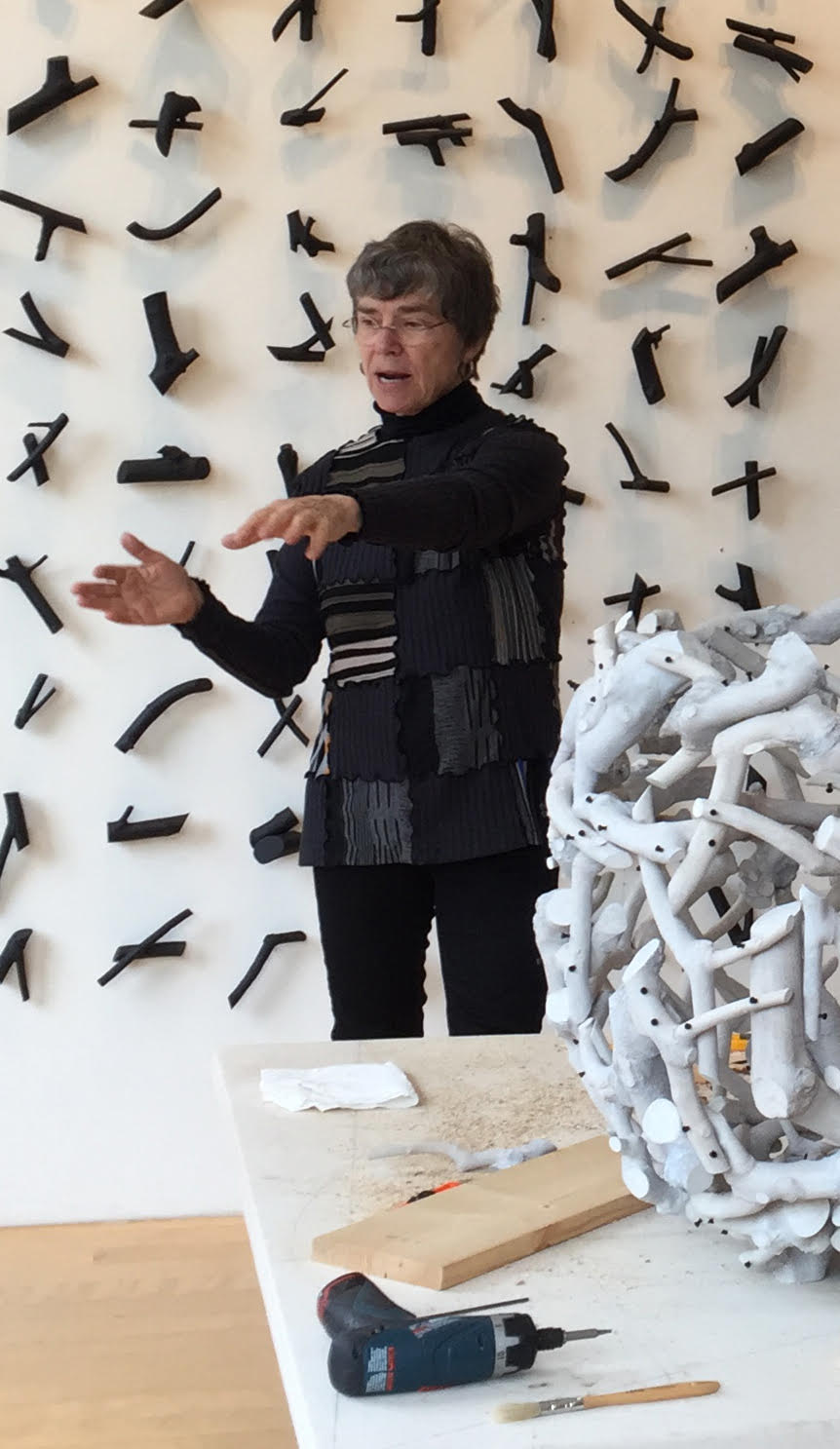
- Born: 1944 (age 81–82); Budapest, Hungary
- Education: University of California, Berkeley
- Known for: Sculptor, fiber artist, installation artist
- Website: gyongylaky.com

Gyöngy Laky (born 1944) is a Hungarian and American sculptor, living in San Francisco. Her work has been exhibited in the U.S., Europe, Asia and South America. She gained recognition early in her career for her linear sculptures constructed in the architectural methods of textile arts. “Laky’s art manifests architectonic sensibility. She is as much an engineer as she is an artist in the conventional sense.” She is also known for her site-specific, outdoor, temporary installations.

She expanded the boundaries through the development of dramatic new installations and the use of new kinds of materials. She is particularly well known in the areas of: 1) sculpture; 2) installations; 3) word works; 4) basketry. She has won awards including the National Endowment for the Arts Award of Distinction. Her works are held in the museum collections of the Smithsonian, the Philadelphia Museum of Art, and the San Francisco Museum of Modern Art, among others. In 2003, The Oral History Center of the Bancroft Library at UC Berkeley, released her oral history. Her personal papers are in the Smithsonian Institution, Washington, D.C.

== Early life ==
Born in Budapest, Hungary in 1944, she immigrated to the United States as a young child. She attended public schools in Carmel, California, and received her bachelor's (1970) and master's degree (1971) from the University of California, Berkeley. While a student there, she studied with Ed Rossbach. She spent a year in India studying in the University of California Professional Studies in India Program (1971–1972).

Her early life is chronicled in an interview conducted by the Archives of American Art.

== Fiberworks Center for the Textile Arts ==
Shortly after her return to the United States from India, she founded Fiberworks Center for the Textile Arts in Berkeley, California in 1973. She played a leading role in the development of the San Francisco Bay Area's prominence in the field. Fiberworks played a pivotal role in the textile arts movement of the 1970s and 1980s, serving as a place where artists could gather, exhibit their work, and learn the skills of this interdisciplinary art form. Laky served as director of the center from its inception in 1973 to 1977. In addition to public classes, artist services and critique groups, the Center established accredited undergraduate and graduate programs in conjunction with Lone Mountain College of San Francisco, California. The Center's gallery was a venue for the emerging avant-garde art. It sponsored gallery exhibitions, both traditional/historic and contemporary. A 1978 three-day Symposium on Contemporary Textile Art was organized by artist Wendy Kashiwa, an event that attracted 475 participants from the United States and abroad. Financial instability threatened the Center's longevity and it was eventually forced to close in 1987. She was also a founding member of the National Basketry Organization.

== Professional career ==
From 1978 to 2005, she served as a faculty member of the University of California, Davis. In addition to teaching, she served as chair during 1995-1997 in the Department of Art. She maintained an art practice in which she was known for her experimentation, risk-taking, and boundary-crossing approach.
