= Ellen Lesperance =

American artist and educator (born 1971)

- Born: December 22, 1971 (age 54); Minneapolis, Minnesota, US
- Education: Skowhegan School of Painting and Sculpture
- Alma mater: University of Washington, Rutgers University
- Website: https://www.ellenlesperance.com

Ellen Lesperance (born December 22, 1971) is an American artist and educator, known for her paintings. Her works are typically gouache paintings that pattern the full-body garments of female activists engaged in Direct Action protests. She is based in Portland, Oregon, and has three children.

== Early life and education ==
Lesperance was born in 1971 in Minneapolis and raised in Seattle. She was raised in a large, mixed-race family with adopted siblings, which she cites as providing her with "raw, tangible feelings regarding inequity and what it means to fight for justice." She attended Roosevelt High School. She continued her studies at University of Washington School of Art (BFA 1995), Mason Gross School of the Arts at Rutgers University (MFA 1999), and Skowhegan School of Painting and Sculpture (1999).

== Career and work ==
Ellen Lesperance employs various art mediums, but she often relies upon the visual language of knitting patterning. In a 2017 article for Frieze magazine, Jen Kabat writes that Lesperance's work "transmits messages about history, feminism and labour through the art of knitting." Citing inspiration from years of working as a pattern knitter for Vogue Knitting magazine, Bauhaus-era female weavers, the Pattern and Decoration Movement, and body-based feminist artists of the 1970s and 1980s, Lesperance's gouache paintings on paper can be followed as patterns to recreate historic knit garments. She sources these historic garments from archival images and film footage of women involved in Direct Action protest, including women from: the Greenham Common Women's Peace Camp, the 1999 Seattle WTO protests, Earth First!, Occupy events, feminist-era protest events, and the feminist art canon. Through studying activists' visual strategies, Lesperance "recognized that Creative Direct Action provides a powerful model for politically-inclined artists... but unfortunately it is creative making that exists outside the purview of contemporary art." In a 2018 review for Artforum, Claire Lehmann describes the paintings as "reanimations of agitators' attire." "Combining the aesthetic pleasure of color field painting, the inexplicable scopophilic compulsion inspired by grids, and the haptic quality of fiber arts into a single composition that also evokes a political tradition is no small feat," art historian R.H. Lossin writes of Lesperance's paintings.

She was an assistant professor at the Pacific Northwest College of Art, where she resigned in 2016 after leading the failed unionization attempt of the school's adjunct faculty. She additionally chaired the Painting Department of the Maine College of Art.

She has received many awards including a Fulbright (2022-2023), a Guggenheim Fellowship (2020), the Pollack Krasner Foundation fellowship (2014–2015), The Louis Comfort Tiffany Foundation Award (2017), the Ford Family Foundation Fellowship, a Hallie Ford Fellowship in the Visual Arts from the Seattle Art Museum(2012), and a Robert Rauschenberg Foundation Artist-as-Activist Grant. She is the author of Peace Camps (Container Corps, 2015) and Velvet Fist (2020). In 2022, she was named a 2022-2023 Fulbright Global Scholar as an unaffiliated independent scholar to conduct research titled Peace Women Knitwear: Greenham Common and Beyond in Australia, Italy and the U.K.

Lesperance is also the organizer of the sweater rental project Congratulations & Celebration, in which a recreation of a Greenham Common Women's Peace Camp jumper is mailed around the world to motivate acts of courage.

== Exhibitions ==
Selected exhibitions include the following:

- 2024 "Stay in the Centre of No-Man's Land" Hollybush Gardens, London, UK
- 2022 "The Land of Feminye" Derek Eller Gallery, New York, NY
- 2022 "Ellen Lesperance: Amazonknights" ICA Miami, Miami, FL
- 2021 "Will There Be Womanly Times?" Hollybush Gardens Gallery, London, England
- 2020 "Together we lie in ditches and in front of machines", Derek Eller Gallery, New York, New York
- 2020 "Ellen Lesperance: Velvet Fist," Baltimore Museum of Art, Baltimore, Maryland
- 2019 "Dress Codes: Ellen Lesperance and Diane Simpson", Frye Art Museum, Seattle, Washington
- 2019 "Less Is A Bore: Maximalist Art & Design", Institute of Contemporary Art, Boston, Massachusetts
- 2019 "Feminist Histories: Artists After 2000", São Paulo Museum of Art, São Paulo, Brazil
- 2018 "Lily of the Arc Lights", Derek Eller Gallery, New York, New York
- 2018 "Still I Rise: Feminisms, Gender, Resistance", Nottingham Contemporary, Nottingham, England and De La Warr Pavilion, Bexhill-on-Sea, England
- 2018 "Nashashibi/Skaer: Thinking Through Other Artists", Tate Museum, St. Ives, England
- 2017 "Trigger: Gender as a Tool and a Weapon", New Museum, New York, New York
- 2016 "Ellen Lesperance, Helen Mirra, Traversing", Armory Center for the Arts, Pasadena, CA
- 2015 "We Were Singing", Adams and Ollman Gallery, Portland, Oregon
- 2014 "Thread Lines", The Drawing Center, New York, New York

== Collections ==
Ellen Lesperance's work is included in the collections of:

- Amon Carter Museum of American Art, Fort Worth, TX
- Baltimore Museum of Art, Baltimore
- Brooklyn Museum, New York
- Kadist Foundation, San Francisco and Paris
- Everson Museum, Syracuse
- Frac Grand Large, Dunkirk, France
- Frye Art Museum, Seattle
- Institute of Contemporary Art Miami, FL
- Minneapolis Institute of Art, Minnesota
- MOCA Los Angeles,
- Museum of Fine Arts Houston, Texas
- Museum Ludwig, Cologne, Germany
- Pennsylvania Academy of Fine Art, Philadelphia
- Perez Art Museum, Miami
- Portland Art Museum, OR
- Rennie Collection, Vancouver BC
- Rose Art Museum, Waltham, MA
- Walker Art Center, Minneapolis
- Whitney Museum of American Art, New York
