= Fiberworks Center for the Textile Arts =

Arts center in Berkeley, CA (1940–1987)

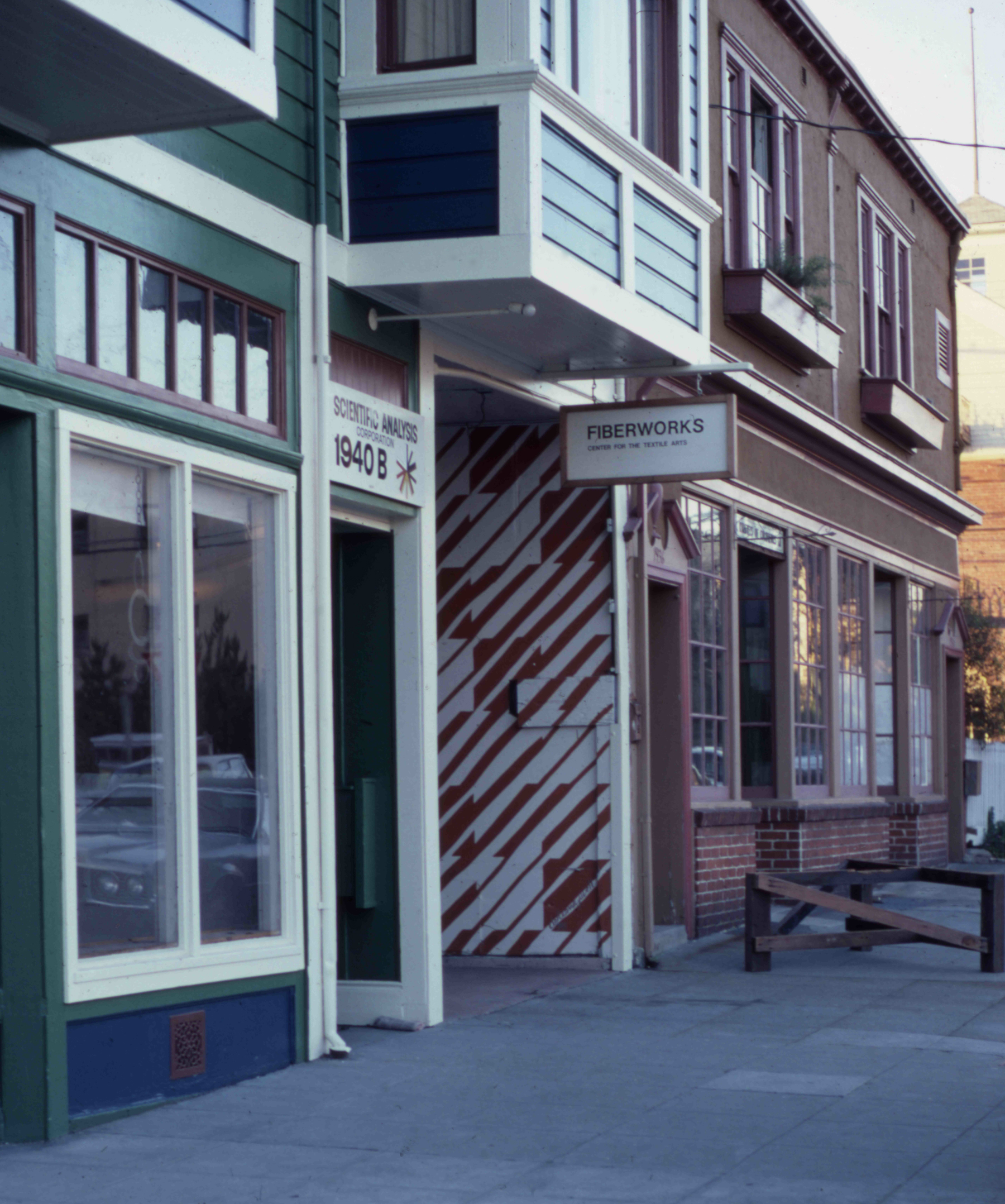
Fiberworks Entry

The Fiberworks Center for the Textile Arts was an internationally recognized center for the textile arts at 1940 Bonita Avenue, Berkeley, California.

== Overview ==
Founded in 1973 by Hungarian-born artist Gyöngy Laky, Fiberworks included a wide range of contemporary and experimental approaches based in the textile arts medium. The Fiberworks gallery showcased textile art in the early 1970s, a time when most other commercial galleries and museums gave textile medium scant exposure.

Foremost was the year-round Community School, the Special Studies program and the Bachelor and Master of Fine Arts accredited programs in conjunction with Lone Mountain College of San Francisco. Many of the school's faculty, lecturers, exhibitors and students were, or would go on to become, influential leaders in the arts including Louise Allrich, Joanne Segal Brandford, Lia Cook, Mildred Howard, David Ireland, Gyöngy Laky, Jack Lenor Larsen, Nance O’Banion and Morgan O’Hara, Ed Rossbach, Yoshiko Iwamoto Wada, and Katherine Westphal, to mention only a few.

== Impact ==
The international impact of the Center became evident when it hosted the Symposium on Contemporary Textile Art, 1978, which attracted notable presenters, faculty, lecturers and participants from around the world. From Tapestry to Fiber Art, published 2017, recognized this Symposium as one of the two important conferences of the decade. Magdalena Abakanowicz and Sheila Hicks, internationally renowned artists, were keynote speakers.

Fiberworks flourished for 15 years, but, due to funding issues, it closed in December, 1987.
