= Yoshiko Iwamoto Wada =

Japanese artist (born 1944)

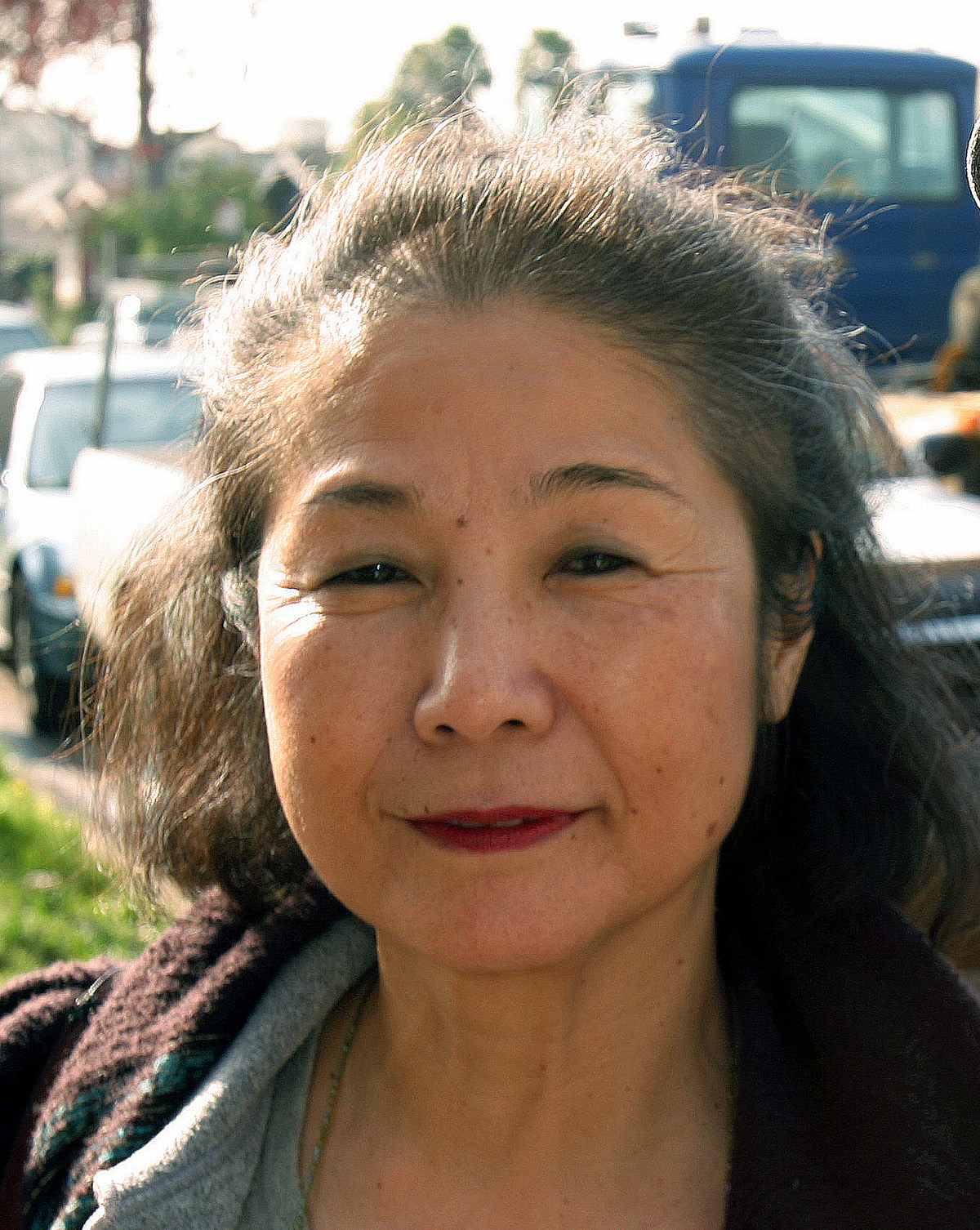
- Yoshiko Iwamoto Wada
- Born: 2 August 1944 (age 82); Kobe, Japan
- Other name: Yoshiko Wada
- Education: Kyoto City University of Arts; University of Colorado Boulder
- Known for: Shibori; Textile art; Installation art
- Notable work: Polyester Dream; PockeTee Dreams
- Spouse: Hercules Morphopoulos
- Website: yoshikowada.com

Yoshiko Iwamoto Wada (born August 2, 1944) is a Japanese textile artist, curator, art historian, scholar, professor, and author. She has received international recognition for her scholarship and expertise in the field of textile art. In 2010, she was named a "Distinguished Craft Educator - Master of Medium" by the James Renwick Alliance of the Smithsonian Institution, who stated: "she is single-handedly responsible for introducing the art of Japanese shibori to this country". In 2016 she received the George Hewitt Myers Award for Lifetime Achievement.

== Early life and education ==
Wada is the granddaughter of a family of kimono makers in Tokyo, and she was raised in Kobe and Tokyo. Her paternal grandmother studied European dressmaking in Europe and encouraged her granddaughter through her love and knowledge of European art. After graduating from Hyogo Kenritsu Kobe High School in 1963, Wada studied textile art and museum sciences at Kyoto City University of Arts (BFA 1967). She moved to the United States, and received a degree from the University of Colorado Boulder (MFA 1971).

Wada returned to Japan for postgraduate studies of ikat weaving and indigo dyeing with Tsuguo ODANI, Kyoto, in 1972 and traditional Japanese silk embroidery at Daihiko Studio, Tokyo, 1980 to 1981. She lived in Kyoto under the Japan Foundation fellowship to conduct research on shibori in Kyoto and Arimatsu Narumi in Nagoya. During this period she began to specialize in the study of traditional Japanese crafts.

== Works ==
Her Japanese background, education and early experience are the basis for the techniques she uses for her artwork, while she gets her inspiration from global cultures, with which she has had extensive contact in her academic endeavors. An example of cultural mergers is her Coca-Cola Kimono (1975). The hand woven cloth is patterned with the Coca-Cola logo, using the labor-intensive e-gasuri (picture kasuri) technique commonly used to pattern Japanese folk weaving.

Seeking to share her knowledge of Japanese textile techniques and kimono she co-founded Kasuri Dyeworks (1975), a gallery and shop in Berkeley, California. "Perhaps more than anyone else, Wada caused the evolution of fiber focus from cloth structure to the dye patterning that we now recognize as surface design". In the 1970s, Wada taught at the Fiberworks Center for the Textile Arts in Berkeley, California. One of her notable students was textile artist Ana Lisa Hedstrom.

From 1983 to 1984, she lived in Ahmedabad, India on an Indo-US Sub-Commission fellowship for education and culture and traveled extensively to research resist-dyed textile traditions in India and to visit cultural heritage sites and museums in India.

In 1979 and 1996, she received the Japan Foundation fellowship which resulted in two books: Shibori: The Inventive Art of Japanese Shaped Resist Dyeing and Memory on Cloth, Shibori Now. Based on her knowledge of kasuri, she co-authored Ikat: An Introduction in 1973. In 1996 she co-curated an exhibition and co-authored the catalog at The Textile Museum Washington, D.C. The Kimono Inspiration: Art and Art-to-Wear in America.

== Affiliations ==
Wada has co-organized and chaired all International Shibori Symposia, including the 2014 symposia, at the China National Silk Museum, Hangzhou. The first one took place in Nagoya in 1992, and led to the foundation of the World Shibori Network, which she co-founded with Kahei Takeda, of Arimatsu. Wada is president Of the World Shibori Network.

In 1998 to 1999, a grant from the Matsushita International Foundation enabled her to study pre-Columbian textiles at the University of California, Berkeley and at the Smithsonian Institution.

She has acted as a consultant to costume designers, such as Colleen Atwood for the movie Memoirs of a Geisha (Academy Award for Best Costume Design), Miyake Design Studio, Kuno Dyeworks, (for Cirque du Soleil and Tiffany & Co.) and Eleanor Coppola (for Francis Ford Coppola Presents). She lectures and teaches workshops on textile-related subjects including shibori, dyeing, and the recycling and transformation of fabric. Exhibitors of her artwork work include the Smithsonian Institution's Renwick Gallery and the International Textile Fair in Kyoto.

Since 2010, Wada has been adjunct professor at the Institute of Textile and Clothing, Hong Kong Polytechnic University.

== Personal life ==
Wada lives in Berkeley, California, she was married to dentist Hercules Morphopoulos (1934–2016). They have one son.

== Grants, awards, honors ==
- 2018. Honorary Fellow of the American Craft Council
- 2016. George Hewitt Myers Award of the George Washington University Museum, recognizing "lifetime achievements and exceptional contributions to the field of textile arts"
- 2010. James Renwick Alliance of the Smithsonian Institution "Distinguished Craft Educator – Master of Medium"
- 2003. American Express Foundation Grant via Aid to Artisans for "Sri Yantra Bandhini Development Project", collaboration with the National Institute of Design, Ahmedabad, India
- 1999. Matsushita International Foundation Grant for "Amarras" replication and comparative study of ancient pre-Columbian shibori tradition
- 1999. The Japan Foundation, Grant in support of catalogue publication of National Museum of Fine Arts, Santiago Chile, for 3rd International Shibori Symposium
- 1996. Asian Foundation Grant for Crafts. Demonstration and exposition of traditional artisans of India, Africa, and Japan. National Institute of Design, Ahmedabad, India, for the 2nd International Shibori Symposium
- 1992. The Japan Foundation, Fellowship for research for Meisen Textile Production and Women Consumers in the First Half of the Twentieth Century Kiryu, Japan
- 1992, 1993. James Renwick Research Fellow, Smithsonian Institution. Senior postdoctoral fellowship for the National Museum of American Art, Washington, DC. Research project The Development of American Shibori / Tie Dye/Shaped-resist since the 1960s. Washington, D.C
- 1983. The Indo-U.S. Sub-Commission on Education and Culture, Fellowship for research on tie-dyed textiles: bandhani, lahariya and ikat. Research affiliation with The National Institute of Design, Ahmedabad, India
- 1979. The Japan Foundation, Fellowship for research on resist-dyed textiles, shibori and kasuri. Research affiliation with Kyoto City Fine Arts University, Kyoto and Arimatsu/Narumi Shibori Preservation Association, Nagoya, Japan.

== Curatorial work ==
- 2013 Curator, mnemonikos: Art of Memory in Contemporary Textiles Jim Thompson Art Center, Bangkok, Thailand
- 2004 Curator, Ragged Beauty: repair and reuse, past and present, Museum of Craft & Folk Art, San Francisco, California
- 2001 Curator, Shibori: Tradition and Innovation – East to West, Museum of Craft & Folk Art, San Francisco, California
- 1999 Curator, El Arte de Teñir con Amarras, Museo Nacional de Bellas Artes, Santiago, Chile
- 1996 Co-Curator, The Kimono Inspiration: Art and Art to Wear in America, The Textile Museum, Washington, D.C.
- 1992-94 Advisor, Japanese Design: A Survey since the 1950s, Philadelphia Museum of Art, Philadelphia, Pennsylvania, traveled to Milan, Paris, Düsseldorf, Osaka

== Publications ==
- Iwamoto Wada, Yoshiko (2002). Memory on Cloth, Shibori Now. Vertical. ISBN 978-1-56836-470-4. OCLC 47221840.
- Iwamoto Wada, Yoshiko; Kellogg, Mary; Barton, Jane (1983). Shibori, The Inventive Art of Japanese Shaped Resist-Dyeing. Vertical. ISBN 978-1-56836-396-7. OCLC 792971961.
- Iwamoto Wada, Yoshiko; A.T. Stevens, Rebecca. The Kimono Inspiration: Art and Art-to-Wear in America. Washington D.C.: The Textile Museum. ISBN 9780876545980. OCLC 33947597.
- Ritch, Diane; Wada, Yoshiko (1975). Ikat: An Introduction (PDF). Archived from the original (PDF) on 2016-03-04.
- Arai, Masano; Iwamoto Wada, Yoshiko (2010). "BENI ITAJIME: CARVED BOARD CLAMP RESIST DYEING IN RED" (PDF). Textile Society of America Symposium Proceedings. University of Nebraska - Lincoln. Archived from the original on 2 November 2021.
