= Patricia Hickman =

American fiber artist (b. 1941)

- Born: 1941 (age 83–84); Fort Morgan, Colorado, U.S.
- Known for: Fiber artist and teacher
- Website: pathickman.com

Pat Hickman (born 1941 in Fort Morgan, Colorado) is an American fiber artist. She attended the University of Colorado Boulder where she received a bachelor's degree in Humanities, and University of California, Berkeley where she received a master's degree in Design and Textiles. She taught at University of Hawaiʻi at Mānoa from 1990 to 2006. She retired as professor emerita of the Art Department. Hickman served as the president of the Textile Society of America from 2008 to 2010.

In 2005 Hickman became a Fellow of the American Craft Council.

Her work is in the Denver Art Museum, and the Smithsonian American Art Museum.
