= Fiber art =

Artworks made of textile materials

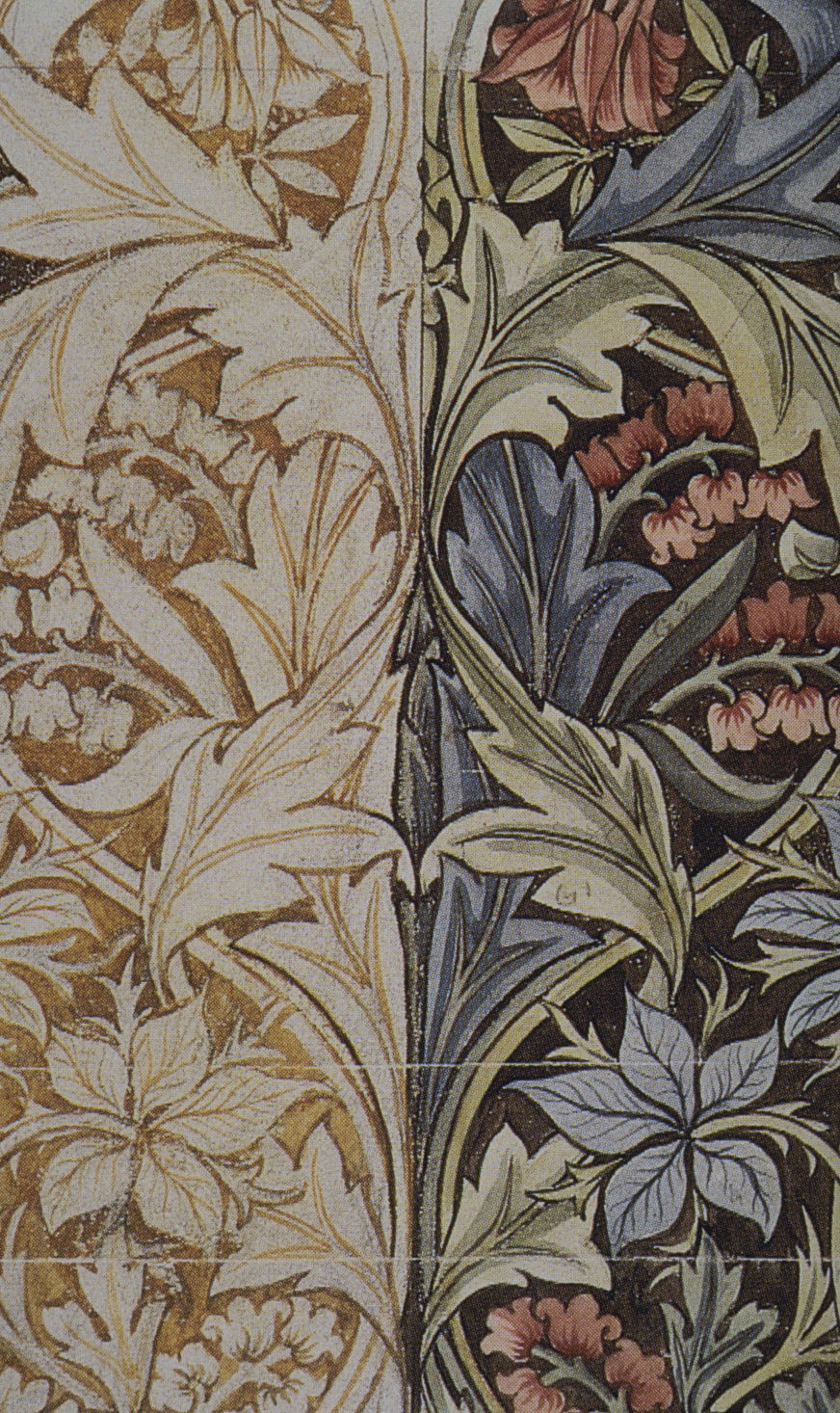
Detail of design for Bluebell or Columbine printed art fabric, 1876, by William Morris.

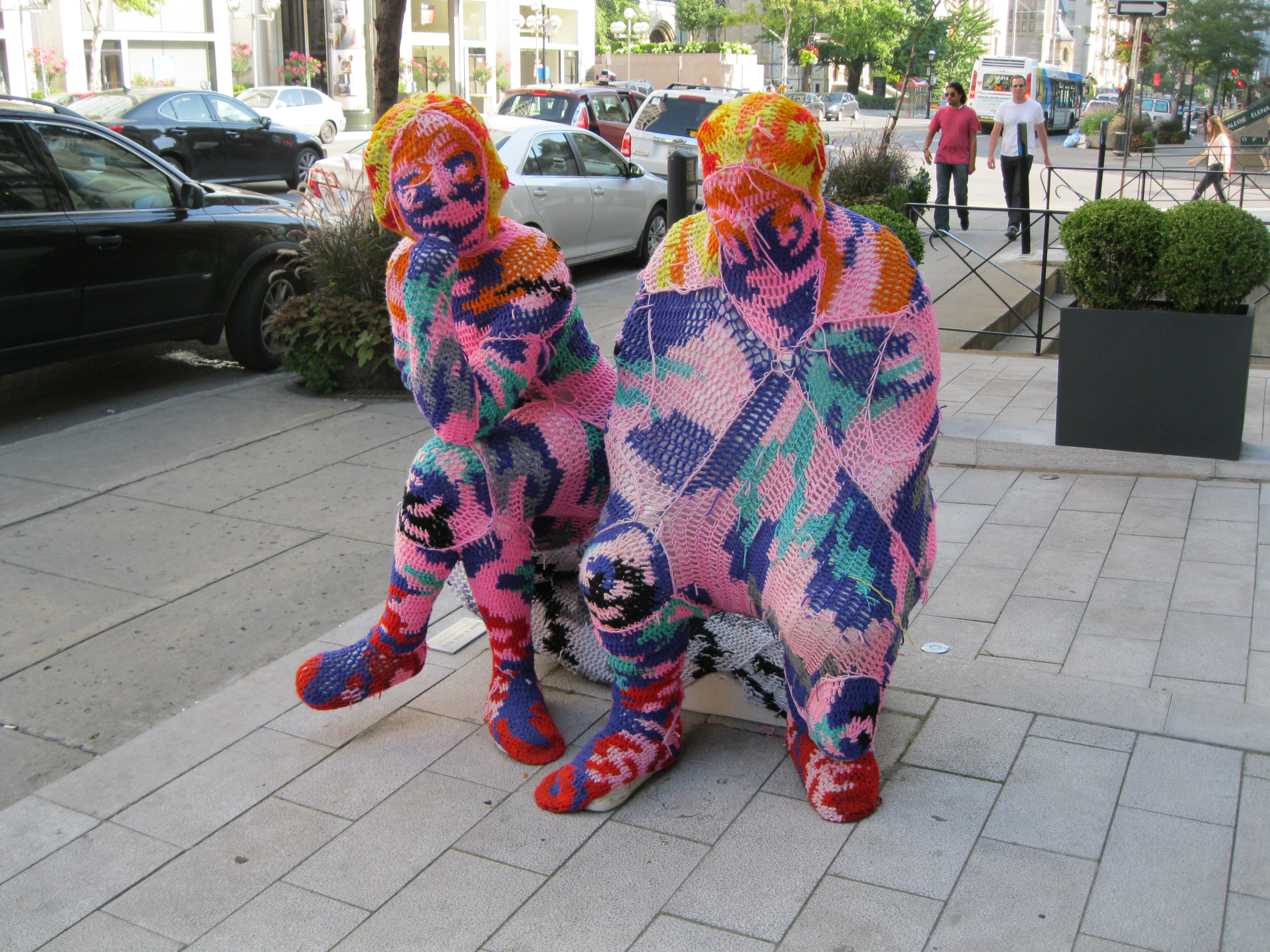
Example of yarn bombing in Montreal, 2009, by fiber artist Olek

Fiber art (fibre art in British spelling) refers to fine art whose material consists of natural or synthetic fiber and other components, such as fabric or yarn. It focuses on the materials and on the manual labor on the part of the artist as part of the works' significance, and prioritizes aesthetic value over utility.

== History ==
The term fiber art came into use by curators and arts historians to describe the work of the artist-craftsman following World War II. Those years saw a sharp increase in the design and production of "art fabric". In the 1950s, as the contributions of craft artists became more recognized—not just in fiber but in clay and other media—an increasing number of weavers began binding fibers into nonfunctional forms as works of art.

The 1960s and 70s brought an international revolution in fiber art. Beyond weaving, fiber structures were created through knotting, twining, plaiting, coiling, pleating, lashing, interlacing, and even braiding. Artists in the United States and Europe explored the qualities of fabric to develop works that could be hung or free standing, "two or three dimensional, flat or volumetric, many stories high or miniature, nonobjective or figurative, and representational or fantasy." In the UK the founding of The 62 Group of Textile Artists coincided with a growth in interest in using textile media in a fine art context. The women's movement of the same era was important in contributing to the rise of fiber art because of the traditional association of women with textiles in the domestic sphere; indeed, many of the most prominent fiber artists are women.

Since the 1980s, fiber work has become more and more conceptual, influenced by postmodernist ideas. For fiber artists, in addition to long-standing experimentation with materials and techniques, this brought "a new focus on creating work which confronted cultural issues such as: gender feminism; domesticity and the repetitive tasks related to women's work; politics; the social and behavioral sciences; material specific concepts related to fiber's softness, permeability, drapability, and so on."

== Fiber within the context of the textile arts ==
Modern fiber art takes its context from the textile arts, which have been practiced globally for millennia. Traditionally, fiber is taken from plants or animals, for example cotton from cotton seed pods, linen from flax stems, wool from sheep hair, or silk from the spun cocoons of silkworms. In addition to these traditional materials, synthetic materials such as plastic acrylic are now used.

Prior to the development of weaving and related approaches using twisted strands, fabrics were made from single sheets of material, such as animal skins. Felting was an invention that allowed for the creation of a textile from fleece that had been sorted, combed, laid out in thin sheets that were then rolled or agitated with other friction until the tiny barbules on the fiber twisted and connected. This process created a smooth connected textile that could be cut, sewn or used in other ways. Evidence of felting was found in burial vaults in Siberia of the 7th or 8th century B.C.

Weaving, however, has been the dominant way to produce clothes. In some cultures, weaving forms demonstrate social status. The more intricate the weaving, the higher the status. Certain symbols and colors also allowed identification of class and position. For example, in the ancient Incan civilization, black and white designs indicated a military status.

In order for the fiber that will be used in weaving (whether plant or animal) to be made into cloth or clothing, it must be spun (or twisted) into a strand known as yarn. When the yarn is ready and dyed for use it can be made into cloth in a number of ways. Knitting and crochet are common methods of twisting and shaping the yarn into garments or fabric. The most common use of yarn to make cloth is weaving. In weaving, the yarn is wrapped on a frame called a loom and pulled taut vertically. This is known as the warp. Then another strand of yarn is worked back and forth wrapping over and under the warp. This wrapped yarn is called the weft. Most art and commercial textiles are made by this process.

In Europe between the fourteenth and seventeenth centuries woven pieces called "tapestries" took the place of paintings on walls. The Unicorn in Captivity is part of a series consisting of seven tapestry panels known as The Hunt of the Unicorn by Franco Flemish from this time period. Much of the art at the time in history was used to tell common folktales that also had a religious theme. As Mark Getlein wrote, "Tapestry is a special type of weaving in which the weft yarns are manipulated freely to form a pattern or design on the front of the fabric... Often the weft yarns are of several colors and the weaver can use the different-colored yarns almost as flexible as a painter uses pigment on canvas."

At the same time period in the Middle East, fiber artists did not make tapestry or wall hanging weavings, but instead created beautifully crafted rugs. The woven rugs did not depict scenes in a story, but instead used symbols and complex designs. An example of this type of art are the giant rugs known as the Ardabil Carpets. Getlein wrote, "Like most Islamic carpets, they were created by knotting individual tufts of wool onto a woven ground."

Another fiber art technique is quilting in which layers of fabric are sewn together. Although this technique has not been around for as long as weaving, it is a popular form of art in American history. Recently, quilted fiber art wall hangings have become popular with art collectors. This non-traditional form often features bold designs. Quilting as an art form was popularized in the 1970s and 80s.

Other fiber art techniques are knitting, rug hooking, felting, braiding or plaiting, macrame, lace making, flocking (texture) and more. There are a wide variety of dye techniques. Sometimes cyanotype and heliographic (sun printing) are used.

Fiber artists face the same dilemma of all artists; determining "what is art?" More so with fiber arts and other media associated with handicraft, because they have long been associated with domestic or utilitarian production. Typically, pieces like pot-holders, which just follow patterns without doing anything more, are not considered works of fiber art. Fiber art works are works of art that communicate some sort of message, emotion or meaning and go beyond just the literal meaning of the materials. Fiber arts face the challenge at times of the message or meaning of the work of art being eclipsed by the study of the materials used and their history, rather than what they contribute to the overall work of art.

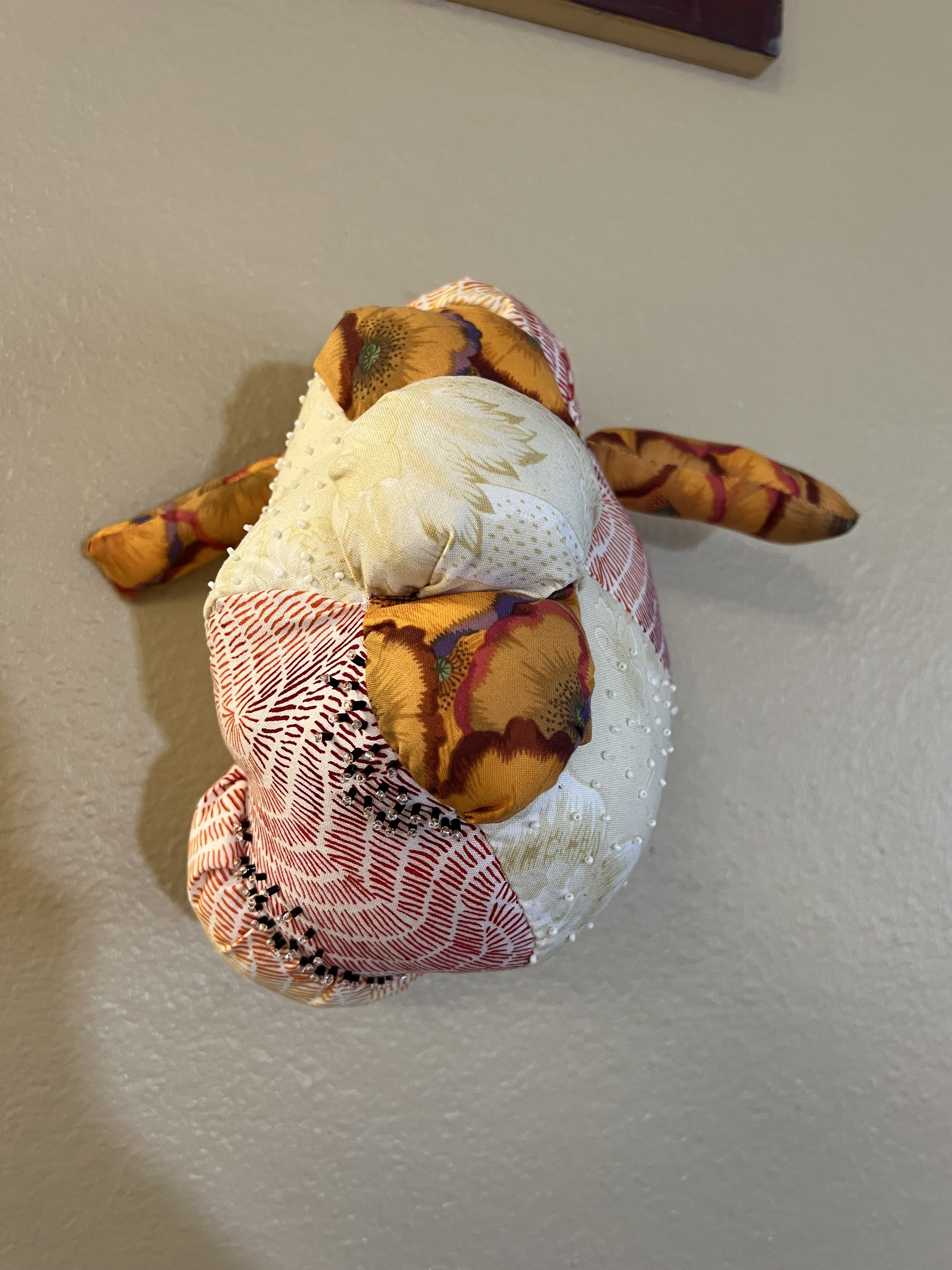
'Flail' a fiber sculpture by artist Madeline Arnault

== Feminism and fiber art ==
=== History of textile work ===
Sewing has often been considered women's work and not regarded as important enough to declare. Textiles have moved with cultural movements. Within Western Society, textiles are described usually as 'textiles' or 'fiber'. These two terms most commonly connote ideas identified with domesticity and women's creativity. This version of women's creativity is labor-intensive yet unfairly devalued as women's work, becoming invisible and described as non-productive in a hetero-normative patriarchal society.

The Industrial Revolution changed the whole industry. Women started to sew less because it became more affordable to purchase well-made clothing from stores. Fabric retailers found that they needed to convince women to return to their sewing machines, so the companies devised a variety of strategies to revitalize sewing. A theme that many retailers employed was to send out the message that sewing not only saved money and let them explore their personal style, but was also a way to be feminine and show gracefulness. Sewing was portrayed as a way to be a good mother and an attractive and thrifty wife.

Dr. Deborah Thom, professor at Cambridge University, helps detail out a time when fiber art took a feminist turn during the Suffrage Movement when women were making embroidered banners for their protests.

=== The reclamation of fiber arts ===
In the 1970s, needlework was reclaimed by the feminist movement. This began the reintroduction of textiles and fiber in 'high art'.

Judy Chicago founded the first feminist art program in the United States, and proceeded to coin the name feminist art, with many artists working with fiber arts, especially in her project Womanhouse. Chicago created one of the first pieces of "high art" that incorporates and celebrates needlework and fabrics within women's history, called The Dinner Party (1979). Linda Nochlin would advance feminist art history and theory by publishing her groundbreaking essay Why Have There Been No Great Women Artists?

=== The Subversive Stitch ===
In 1984, Rozsika Parker published The Subversive Stitch: Embroidery and the making of the feminine. Parker has published books on art history and psychotherapy, and uses theories from both fields in her analysis of "women's work". Parker examines the belief of women and embroidery as both feminine and natural, and the appearance of natural that is actually socially constructed. Her analysis on feminism is strongly argued that needlework signifies the relationship between women and the domestic sphere. Gendering that concept dates back to the 1500s when other crafts such as embroidery and textile work were made by women.

Many people had varying reactions from emotionally moved to deeply disgraced after seeing the exhibitions 'The Subversive Stitch', of which incorporated two shows called 'Embroidery in Women's Lives 1300–1900' and 'Women in Textiles Today' in July 1989, as recorded in Pennina Barnett's article "Afterthoughts on curating 'The Subversive Stitch' ". The critical response from women and feminist's reviews and articles were similar. These two shows were based on Parker's book.

Barnett describes that most historical studies of embroidery concentrate on questions of style and technique, where these exhibitions track the idea of femininity that was forced upon women through embroidery from medieval times, when it was considered a high art form practiced by both men and women, to its current denotation as a 'feminine craft'. But perhaps this exhibition, with both historical and modern shows side by side provoke new ideas into the more historical objects. Adding names and dates to the creation of the objects thrusts them into the art world once again. The context in which these women worked, varying greatly because of class, race, and gender, juxtaposed with contemporary work beside names, dates, and even poetry created a language and a new critical way of looking into this medium.

As Ann Newdigate states in her essay "Kinda art, sorta tapestry: tapestry as shorthand access to the definitions, languages, institutions, attitudes, hierarchies, ideologies, constructions, classifications, histories, prejudices and other bad habits of the West", there was a shift in textiles after The Subversive Stitch was published.

"Then in 1984 when Rozsika Parker's The Subversive Stitch: Embroidery and the Making of the Feminine, focusing on textiles, could not be resisted by even the most conservative of Western practitioners; modernism was finally disrupted in the Low Art sphere. The empowering implications spread beyond European textile artists and affected curators, teachers, and art administrators in a much wider Western context. The post-modern influence, even though in only a few instances, started to blend the firmly drawn lines of hierarchical distinctions. Twenty years after I had taken up art as my vocation, I began to feel the oppositional codes of the separate spheres slowly eroding as I wrote my thesis and investigated the domestication of tapestry from its previous high art status (until about the turn of the century) as a European male practice.

— Ann Newdigate, Kinda art, sorta tapestry: tapestry as shorthand access to the definitions, languages, institutions, attitudes, hierarchies, ideologies, constructions, classifications, histories, prejudices and other bad habits of the West, New Feminist Art Criticism: Critical Strategies. p. 178.

=== Craftivism within fiber arts ===
Craftivism is the continuation of craft for political purposes. It's largely linked to third-wave feminism and also other Feminist movements such as the music movement Riot Grrrl. The term craftivism was coined by Betsy Greer in 2003, and runs Craftivist Collective, however it is technically not a new term.

Germaine Greer, who advocates for the connection of women, nature, and craft, argued that women's craft should be in the home because it is a living art, not in a gallery or museum because galleries and museums are representative of dead male culture. Greer supports the use of textiles in different settings, of which craftivism almost always employs.

Most recently, craftism and the fiber arts have served as an important channel for the expressive of social protest, an example of which is the women's marches after the election of Donald Trump in 2018 and the pussyhat phenomenon.

Modern craftivist is knowing as handicraft because people use it to crafting to protest or transmitted information when they protest.

=== Fiber arts today ===
In Hoopla: The Art of Unexpected Embroidery, author Leanne Prain includes interviews with fiber artists from around the world about their work within contemporary art and commercial design. While each interview is tailored to the individual artist, Prain always asks, "Do you believe that your gender or social class has any bearing on your attraction to an involvement with needlework?" Overall, the answers reveal a recognition of the medium's feminine origins and an appreciation for the feminist attitudes that it supports.

However, modern fiber arts is not strictly a feminist endeavor despite its history. In a review of the "Pricked: Extreme Embroidery" exhibit at the Museum of Arts and Design (January–April 2008), Karen Rosenberg notes that the medium has expanded to such a degree that there are many approaches which artists may take to distinguish themselves. She conjectures that curators intentionally eschewed the word "craft" to instead focus on things like "process" and "materiality" and concentrate on more serious topics. Rosenberg argues that the ability of needlework to stand in for and rise above traditional painting lends credence to the theory of fiber arts no longer being considered a niche practice, and notes that the artists have "done much to erode the distinction between the fine and the decorative arts".

In The Subversive Stitch: Embroidery and the Making of the Feminine, Kate Walker writes:

"I have never worried that embroidery's association with femininity, sweetness, passivity and obedience may subvert my work's feminist intention. Femininity and sweetness are part of women's strength. Passivity and obedience, moreover, are the very opposite of the qualities necessary to make a sustained effort in needlework. What's required are physical and mental skills, fine aesthetic judgment in colour, texture and composition; patience during long training; and assertive individuality of design (and consequent disobedience of aesthetic convention). Quiet strength need not be mistaken for useless vulnerability."

— Kate Walker, Rozsika Parker, The Subversive Stitch: Embroidery and the Making of the Feminine. 1984. Print

The overall tone of the textile and fiber arts today sounds usually similar to feminist theory and strategy when Ann Newdigate states:

"For me, now, it does not matter whether what I do in my studio complies with a minor or a major language – whether it is kinda art or sorta textile. Whenever I feel a definition coming on, I try to remember to ask myself 'Who constructed the definition?', 'Who needs the oppositional distinctions and is going to benefit from them?', and 'Why should I comply with those codes and conventions?"

— Ann Newdigate, Kinda art, sorta tapestry: tapestry as shorthand access to the definitions, languages, institutions, attitudes, hierarchies, ideologies, constructions, classifications, histories, prejudices and other bad habits of the West, New Feminist Art Criticism: Critical Strategies, p. 181

In 2013, Canadian artist, Colleen Heslin won national recognition for her piece Almost Young and Wild and Free which was praised for its "fresh approach to a traditional medium" using textiles and craftwork to produce a colourful, abstract canvas of dyed materials.

== List of notable fiber artists ==
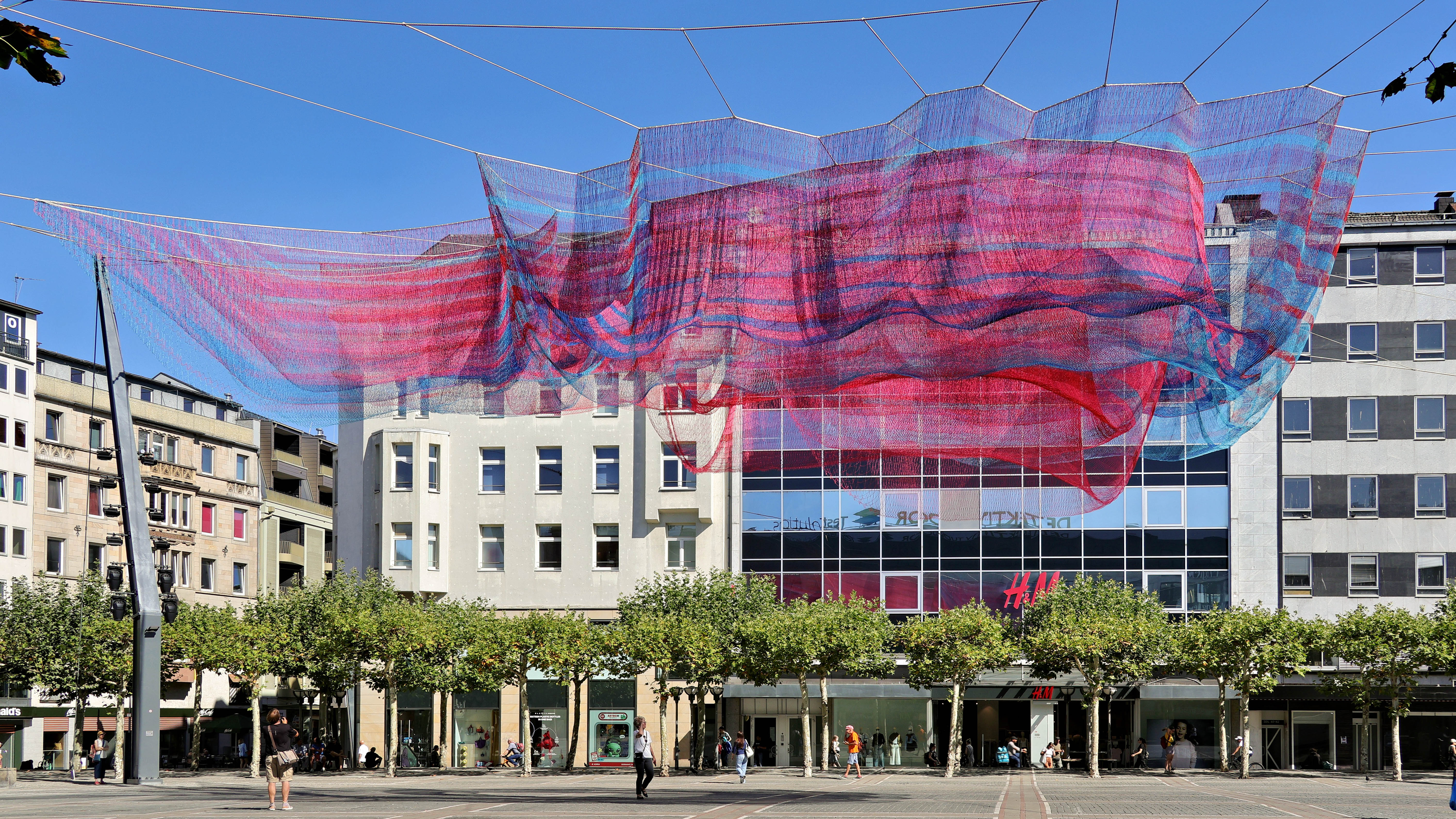
A Sky Full of Hope by Janet Echelman in Frankfurt

- Magdalena Abakanowicz
- Anni Albers
- Olga de Amaral
- El Anatsui
- Ian Berry
- Alighiero Boetti
- Mary Borkowski
- Mary Buskirk
- Bisa Butler
- Nick Cave
- Nancy Crow
- Dominic Di Mare
- Janet Echelman
- Tracey Emin
- Kaffe Fassett
- Rodrigo Franzao
- Mary Giles
- Helena Hernmarck
- Ana Lisa Hedstrom
- Sheila Hicks
- Alice Kettle
- Alicja Kozłowska
- Dorothy Meredith
- Mascha Mioni
- Norma Minkowitz
- Aurèlia Muñoz
- Eve Peri
- Grayson Perry
- Eric-Paul Riege
- Erin M. Riley
- Faith Ringgold
- Ed Rossbach
- Jane Sauer
- Judith Scott
- Kay Sekimachi
- Heather Sheehan
- Kiki Smith
- Sherri Smith
- Lenore Tawney
- Joana Vasconcelos
- Yoshiko Iwamoto Wada
- Stephen West
- Billie Zangewa
- Elizabeth Zimmermann

=== Resources ===
There are many specialized textiles programs around the world. The Royal School of Needlework in England is the only school dedicated solely to fiber arts.

Infrastructure supporting the recognition and development of fiber arts has increased over the 20th century. Fiber arts study groups have proven to be particularly important in this regard. Two groups of note include:

1. the Textiles Study Group located in the U.K. was established in 1973. It began with a focus on embroidery and expanded to a wider focus on the fiber arts, particularly the delivery of education. Membership is highly selective, requiring close scrutiny of each applicants work. It maintains a core group of about 25 teachers.
2. the Textile Study Group of New York broadly supports appreciation of fiber arts and fiber artists. Established in 1977, there are monthly meetings during the academic year in the New York City area. This group's mission has a broad interest in serving to inspire artists and aficionados and to support networks that will build fiber arts opportunities.

Members associated with both groups have made significant contributions to the field as artists, teachers, and authors.

== See also ==
- Textile design
- Mathematics and fiber arts
- String art
- Wearable art
- Mixed media
