= List of Cranbrook Academy of Art alumni and faculty =

This is a list of notable people from the Cranbrook Academy of Art, Bloomfield Hills, Michigan.

== Notable alumni ==
=== Artists ===
==== Ceramics ====
- Richard DeVore – ceramicist
- Leza McVey – studio potter
- Annabeth Rosen - ceramic sculptor
- Monica Rudquist – ceramic artist
- Stacy Jo Scott – ceramic artist, digital fabricator arts educator, writer
- Toshiko Takaezu – ceramic artist

==== Mixed media ====
- Olga de Amaral – (B.F.A. textiles)
- Nick Cave – fabric sculptor, performance artist
- Sonya Clark – visual artist, mixed media
- Diana Guerrero-Maciá – visual artist
- Lyric Shen – mixed media, sculptor, tattoo artist
- Anne Wilson – visual artist, mixed media

==== Painters ====
- Marc Awodey – contemporary artist, painting and poetry
- Shiva Ahmadi – painter
- Frederic James – painter
- Judith Lodge – painter
- Fred Mitchell – painter

==== Printmakers and book artists ====
- Walter Hamady – artist, book designer, papermaker
- Stephanie Pogue - artist and art educator
- Roland Poska – papermaker, printmaker
- Ron Kowalke - artist and art educator

==== Sculptors ====
- Susan Aaron-Taylor – sculptor
- Barbara Cooper – artist, sculptor
- Paul Granlund – sculptor
- Waylande Gregory – art-deco ceramics sculptors
- Duane Hanson – artist, sculptor
- Beth Katleman – sculptor
- Tony Rosenthal – sculptor
- Sherri Smith – (M.F.A. 1967) fiber artist, sculptor, and professor
- Susan York – artist, sculptor

=== Designers ===
==== Architecture ====
- Ed Bacon – urban planner, architect
- Peter Bohlin – architect
- Theodore Galante – architect
- James Hubbell – artist, architect, sculptor, founder of the Ilan-Lael Foundation
- Fumihiko Maki – architect
- Gyo Obata - architect
- Ralph Rapson – architect
- Eero Saarinen – architect, industrial designer, and furniture designer. Designs include the Tulip group, Gateway Arch in St. Louis, Missouri and the Dulles International Airport Main Terminal
- Joseph Allen Stein – architect
- Harry Weese – (Fellowship Urban Planning 1938–1939) architect
- Hani Rashid – (M.A. architecture, 1985) architect
- Jesse Rieser – (M.A. architecture)
- Karl Chu – (M.A. architecture)
- Donald Bates – (M.A. architecture)
- Benjamin Erskine Nicholson – (M.A. architecture)
- Raoul Bunschoten – (M.A. architecture)

==== Furniture design ====
- Harry Bertoia – artist, sound art sculptor, modern furniture designer
- Charles Eames – architect, furniture designer; designer of the Eames Chair (see Ray Kaiser, below)
- Ray Kaiser Eames - abstract artist and furniture designer who married Charles Eames in 1941 and collaborated on most of the Eames designs
- Florence Knoll – architect, furniture designer
- Jay Sae Jung Oh – artist and furniture designer

==== Graphic design ====
- Ed Fella – graphic designer, artist, educator
- Jeffery Keedy – graphic designer, type designer
- P. Scott Makela – graphic designer, type designer
- Nancy Skolos – (B.F.A. design, 1977) graphic designer
- Lorraine Wild – (B.F.A. 1975) graphic designer

==== Industrial design ====
- Niels Diffrient – ergonomics designer, industrial designer

==== Textile design ====
- Ruth Adler-Schnee – (M.F.A. 1946) textile designer and first female architecture graduate student from Cranbrook
- Mary Balzer Buskirk – (M.F.A.) mid-century modern fiber artist
- Carolyn Crump – 3D quilt maker
- Jack Lenor Larsen – (M.F.A. 1951) textile designer.
- Mary Walker Phillips – (M.F.A. 1963) popularized contemporary hand knitting
- Bhakti Ziek – (M.F.A. fiber, 1989) contemporary textile artist

==== Other design ====
- Chunghi Choo – jewelry designer and metalsmith
- Wu Liangyong – urban planner

== Notable faculty ==
This is a list of both current and past notable faculty and visiting artist-in-residence, listed in alphabetical order by last name.

- Marshall Fredericks – sculptor
- Maija Grotell – Artist-in-Residence, Ceramics Department
- Keith Haring – Artist-in-Residence and mural installation in 1987.
- David Hilliard – Artist-in-Residence, Photography Department, 2007–2008.
- Ken Isaacs – head of the design department from 1956–1958, known for matrix-based modular system to build living structures.
- Jane Lackey – textile and fiber artist
- Daniel Libeskind – architect
- Michael McCoy – Co-Chair, Design, 1971–1995
- Katherine McCoy – Co-Chair, Design, 1971–1995
- Carl Milles – Artist-in-Residence, Sculpture Department
- Eliel Saarinen – Finnish architect known for his work with art nouveau buildings.

=== Presidents and directors ===
- Eliel Saarinen, President, 1932–1946
- Zoltan Sepeshy, President, 1946–1966
- Glen Paulsen, President, 1966–1970
- Wallace Mitchell, 1970–1977
- Roy Slade, 1977–1994
- Susana Torre, Director, 1994–1996
- Gerhardt Knodel, Director, 1997–2007
- Reed Kroloff, Director, 2007–2014
- Christopher Scoates, Director, 2014–2018
- Susan Ewing, Director, 2019–2021
- Paul Sacaridiz, Director, 2022–Present
