= Wall Hangings (exhibition) =

1969 exhibition at Museum of Modern Art

Wall Hangings was an exhibition of textile fiber art held at the Museum of Modern Art (MoMA) in New York from 25 February to 4 May 1969. It was planned in 1966 and toured 11 cities in 1968–1969.

== About ==
Wall Hangings was curated by Mildred Constantine and Jack Lenor Larsen and featured 28 artists from 8 countries. It was the first major art exhibition in fiber arts or textiles. This exhibition showcased the artists’ work in ways not typically seen before like hanging from the ceiling, standing free from the wall, and even on revolving turntables to allow visual access to the great details put into every pieces displayed. Artworks were noted for their techniques, material, scale and three-dimensionality and were referenced both to their break from and use of tradition in those areas. The history of the artists in the show were directly attributed to the Austrian Wiener Werkstätte and the German Bauhaus, though mention was made of other inspirations such as Pre-Columbian Peruvian weavers.

== Ideology ==
The 1968 MoMA press release for the exhibition stated: "During the last 10 years, developments in weaving have caused us to revise our concepts of this craft and view the work within the context of twenty-first century art. The weavers from eight countries represented in this exhibition are not part of the fabric industry, but of the world of art. They have extended the formal possibilities of weaving, frequently using complex and unique techniques."

== Impact ==
The only national art world press was written by Louise Bourgeois for Craft Horizons and was negative and suggested that the work was not fine art. As craft theorist Elissa Auther states in her 2009 book String Felt & Thread: "Despite the awareness of the negative art world attitudes concerning media traditionally associated with the crafts, the strategy Constantine and Larsen adopted to assert fiber's art status was to introduce the new genre into the fine art world on the terms set by that world."

== Participating artists ==
- Magdalena Abakanowicz
- Anni Albers
- Olga de Amaral
- Evelyn Anselevicius
- Thelma Becherer
- Dolores Dembus Bittleman
- Jagoda Buić
- Zofia Butrymowicz
- Barbara Falkowska
- Wilhelmina Fruytier
- Elsi Giauque
- Françoise Grossen
- Sheila Hicks
- Ewa Jaroszynska
- Annemarie Klingler
- Walter G. Nottingham
- Jolanta Owidzka
- Mary Walker Phillips
- Ed Rossbach
- Mariette Rousseau-Vermette
- Wojciech Sadley
- Moik Schiele
- Herman Scholten
- Kay Sekimachi
- Sherri Smith (artist)
- Gunta Stölzl
- Lenore Tawney
- Susan Weitzman
