= Anselevicius =

Anselevicius is a surname. Notable people with the surname include:

- Evelyn Anselevicius (1923–2003), American artist
- George Anselevicius (1923–2008), Lithuanian-born American architect
