= Bhakti Ziek =

American artist (born 1946)

- Born: June 6, 1946 (age 80)
- Occupations: Artist, weaver
- Website: bhaktiziek.com

Bhakti Ziek (born Judith Anne Ziek; June 6, 1946) is an American artist known for narrative weavings incorporating contemporary jacquard technology. She has been active in the contemporary fiber field for over four decades as an artist, author, teacher and lecturer. Ziek currently resides in Santa Fe, NM.

== Early career and education ==
Ziek was born on June 6, 1946, in New York City, to Irving and Nona Ziek. She received a B.A. in psychology from SUNY at Stony Brook, then moved to Manhattan where she learned to weave at the Crafts Students League. In 1971 Ziek went to San Miguel de Allende, Mexico to study crafts, and in 1972 moved to Guatemala where she resided until 1976. She studied backstrap weaving with Mayan women and later co-authored the book Weaving on a Backstrap Loom with Nona Ziek. She obtained a B.F.A. from the University of Kansas in 1980. As an artist, she became known for wall pieces made with painted warps and hand-manipulated weft brocading. Her work was included in the prestigious traveling exhibition Frontiers in Fiber, curated by Mildred Constantine and Jack Lenor Larsen.

== Education and teaching ==
Ziek received her M.F.A. from the Fibers Department of Cranbrook Academy of Art in 1989, studying under Gerhardt Knodel. In 1990 she was hired as an assistant professor at Philadelphia College of Textiles & Science to run the woven design program. She helped establish the graduate program in textile design, received tenure, was promoted to Associate Professor, and received the President’s Award for Excellence in Teaching. She left in 2000 and went to the University of Kansas (2000-2002). She was a visiting professor at Arizona State University (2007-2008), and has taught summer classes at the School of the Art Institute of Chicago.

== Art career ==
Ziek first became known for intricate weavings using painted warps and supplemental weft brocade and articles she wrote about these processes. Later she became part of the narrative/storytelling movement and her work was placed in collections at the Philadelphia Convention Center and The Museum of Arts and Design

Ziek received a Creation Grant from the Vermont Arts Council in 2012.

Works by Bhakti Ziek

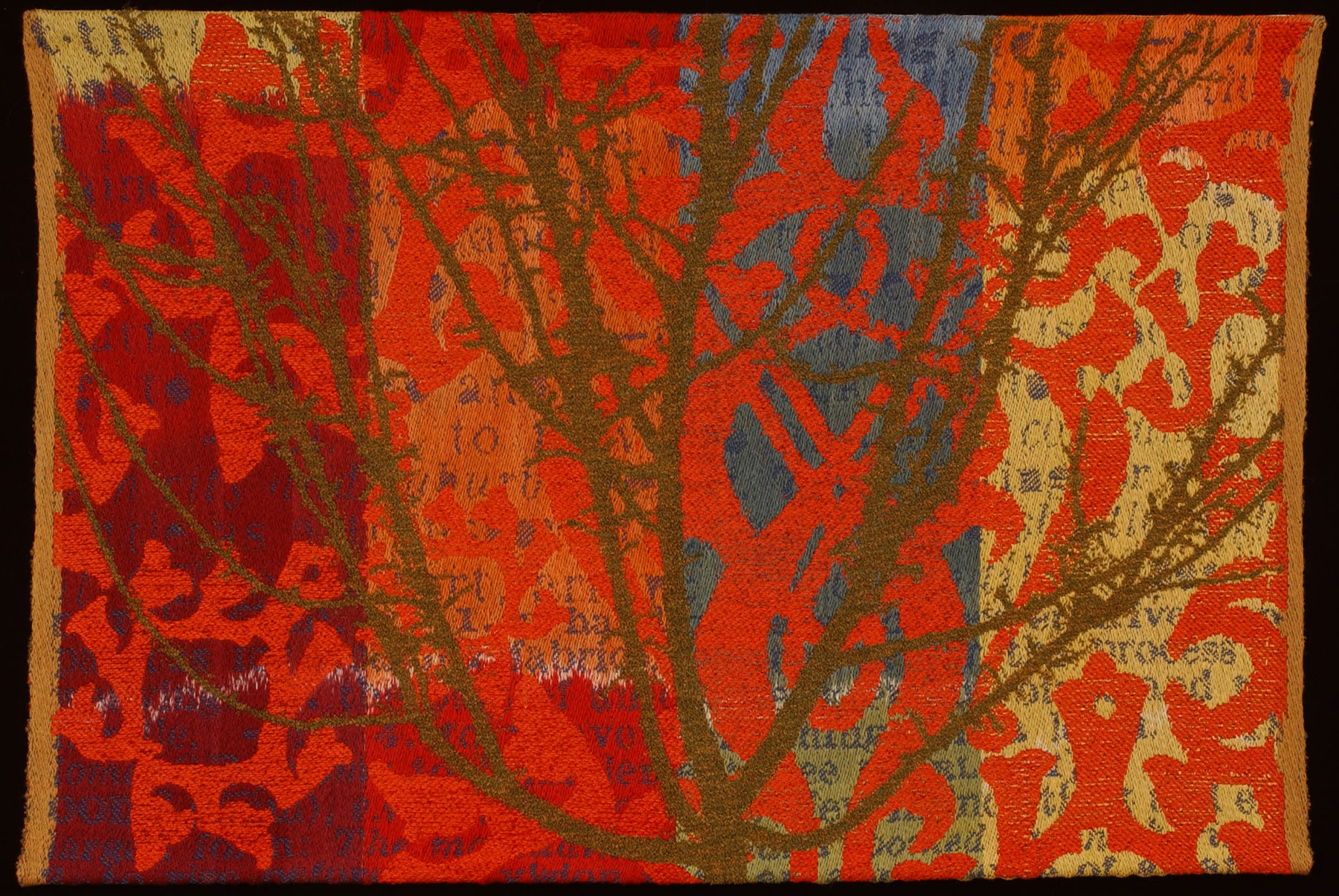
Crabapple

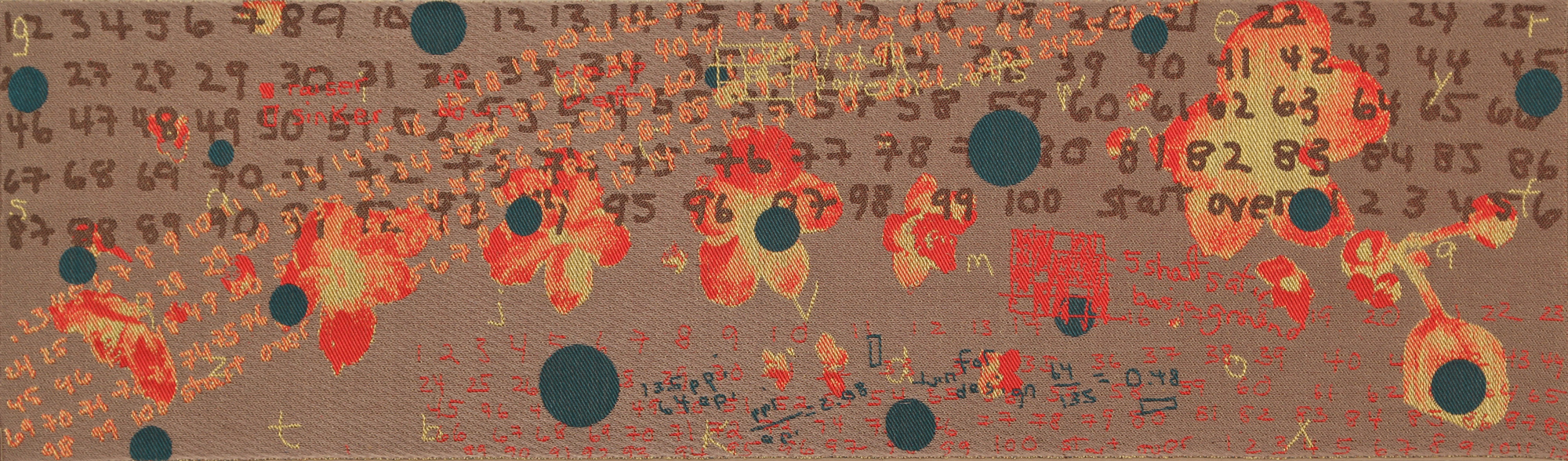
Counting

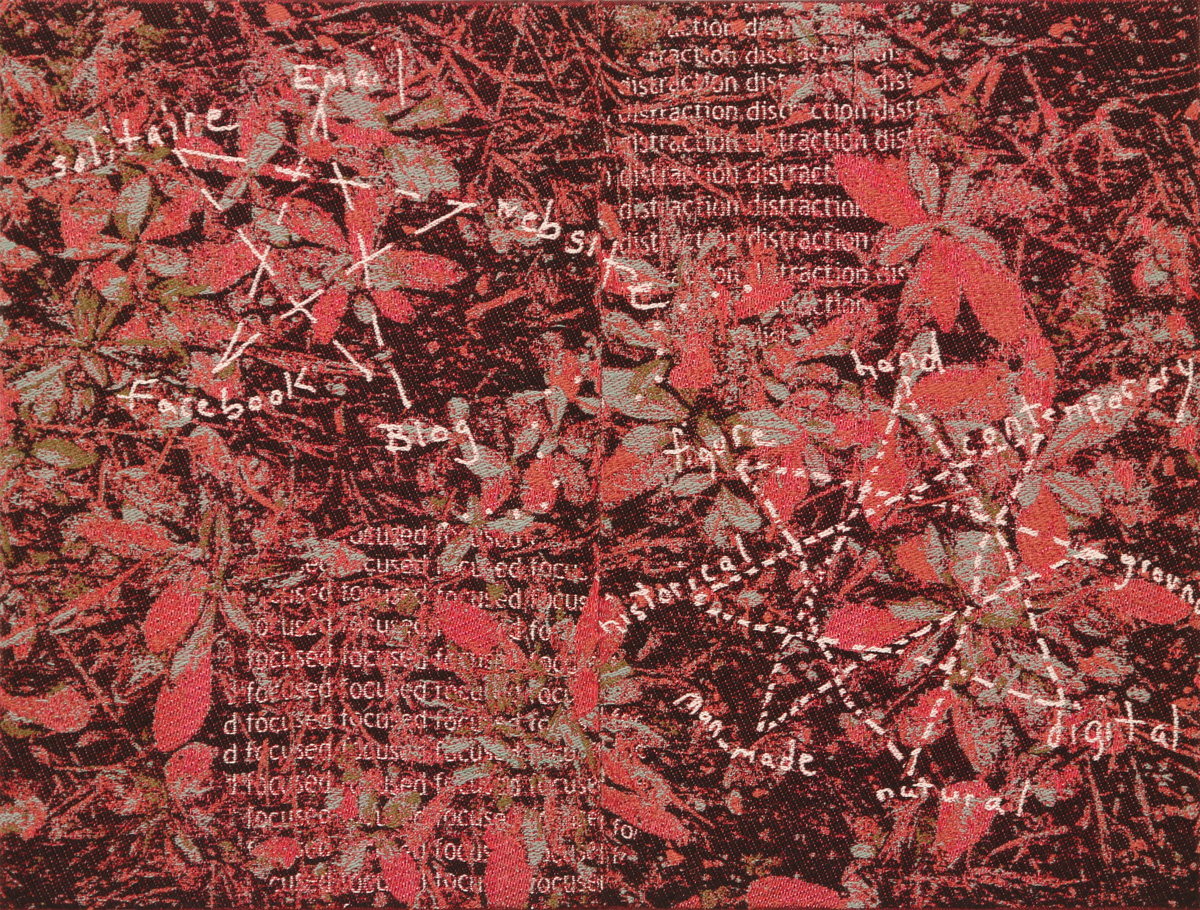
Focused Distraction

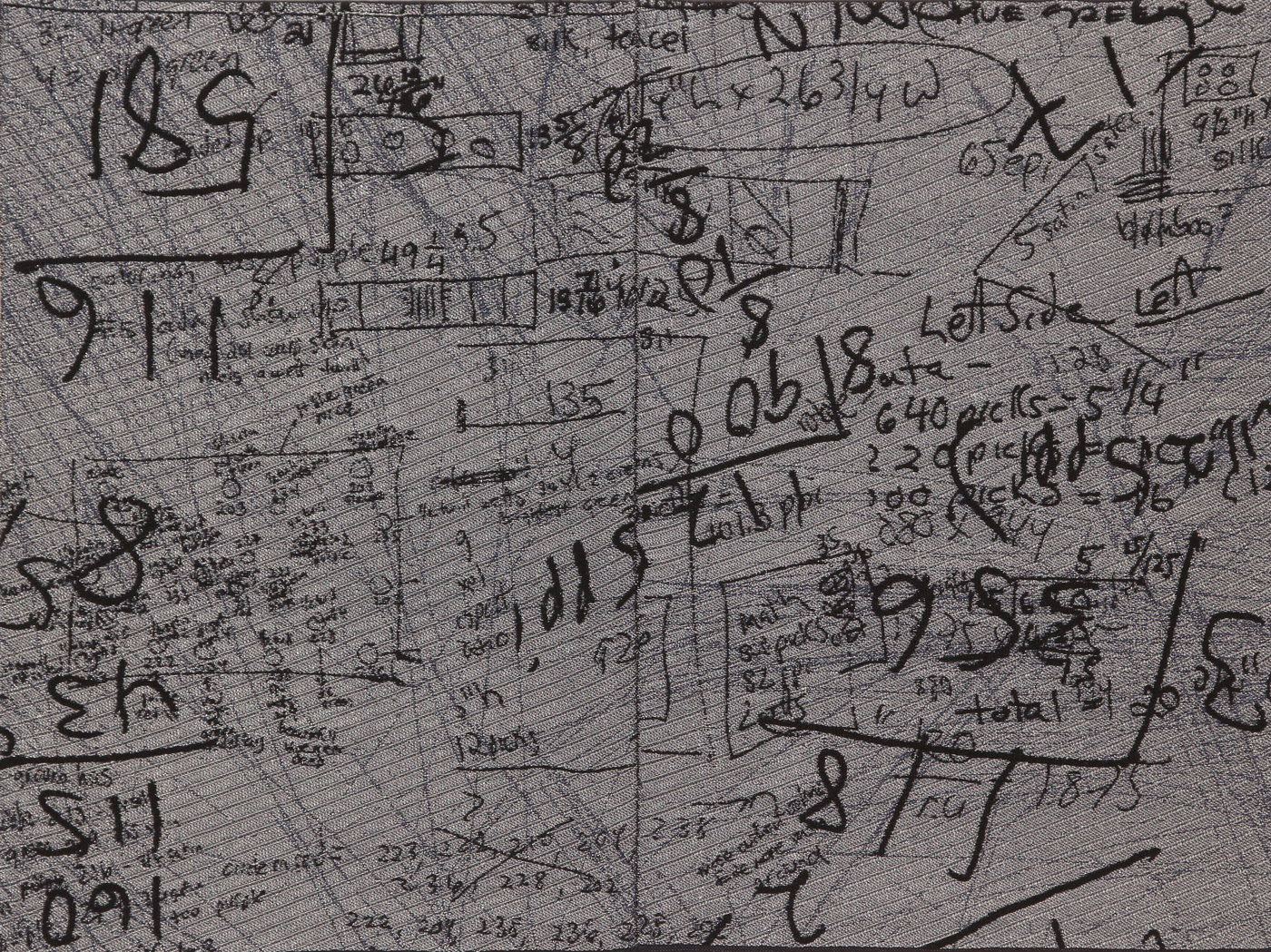
Math

== Published works ==
- Ziek, Bhakti; Ziek, Nona (1978), Weaving on a Backstrap Loom: Pattern Designs from Guatemala, Hawthorne Books, ISBN 978-0801531873
- Ziek, Bhakti; Schlein, Alice (2006), The Woven Pixel: Designing for Jacquard and Dobby Looms Using Photoshop, Bridgewater Press, ISBN 9780964447417
  - ——; ——. "The Woven Pixel: Designing for Jacquard and Dobby Looms Using Photoshop". handweaving.net.
