= Marta Palau Bosch =

Spanish-Mexican artist (1934–2022)

- Born: 17 July 1934; Albesa, Lleida, Spain
- Died: 13 August 2022 (aged 88)
- Known for: Tapestry, mural, painting, engraving, sculpture

Marta Palau Bosch (17 July 1934 – 13 August 2022) was a Spanish-Mexican artist who resided in Mexico. She worked in engraving, painting, sculpture, and most prominently in tapestries, defining herself by her profound artistic use and arrangement of native Mexican natural materials. She was one of the first Mexican artists to focus on themes around women's and immigrants' experiences during the 1970s, especially in her Ilerda series of tapestries and later with her Nahual sculptures.

== Early life ==
Marta Palau Bosch was born on 17 July 1934 in Albesa, Spain. As her parents were exiled during the era of Francoist Spain, the family moved to Mexico in 1940. From 1955 to 1965 she studied at "La Esmeralda", the school of painting and sculpture for the Instituto Nacional de Bellas Artes (INBA) in Mexico City. Her engraving professor at the institute was the Colombian engraver Guillermo Silva Santamaría. She traveled to California and Barcelona in order to specialize in tapestry technique; at San Diego State University she was a student of Paul Lingren, while in Barcelona she was a disciple of Josep Grau-Garriga.

== Career ==
In 1968, Palau was a founding member of the Salón Independiente de 1968, an artistic project collectively organized as a response against the institute's convocation of the "Exposición Solar" ('Solar Exhibition'), highlighting current artistic themes in Mexico as a parallel cultural event for the 1968 Summer Olympics. The Salon's response reflected the societal context of the repression of student activist movements in Mexico during that year as part of the Movimiento de 1968 en México. Some of the artists involved were Helen Escobedo, Lilia Carrillo, Gilberto Aceves Navarro, Kazuya Sakai, Manuel Felguérez, Vicente Rojo, Fernando Garcia Ponce, Brian Nissen, and Arnaldo Coen, among others. The Salon continued its political dissidence with exhibitions in 1969 and 1970, after which it dissolved.

From 1973 to 1976, Palau Bosch served as coordinator of the Centre d'Art Modern de Guadalajara, Jalisco. At the beginning of the 1980s she created an experimental workshop in Havana.

In 1981, Palau Bosch presented an homage to the former Mexican president Lázaro Cárdenas del Río, in Jiquilpan, in thanks for his work accepting refugees from the Spanish Republican Party into Mexico after the Spanish Civil War. The silk-screen prints that she exhibited there are some of the works that most closely reflect her personal history.

In her own words she related this aspect of her life:

No fui consciente de lo que Lázaro Cárdenas había hecho, por mis padres y por muchos otros republicanos españoles, hasta años después de mi llegada a México. No fui consciente de lo que significaba vivir en el exilio lejos de una patria donde la justicia había sido pisoteada y arrastrada por el fascismo. Yo era demasiado pequeña cuando llegué a México para darme cuenta del dolor que representaba todo esto. Supe más tarde que Lázaro Cárdenas era el hombre que había dado una segunda patria y una nueva nacionalidad a los refugiados españoles. A mí me dio la única que he tenido siempre, pues la otra, la española, la había perdido antes de ganarla.

— Rita Eder, Marta Palau. La intuición y la técnica.

"I was not conscious of what Lázaro Cárdenas had done, for my parents and for many other Spanish Republicans, until years after my arrival in Mexico. I was not conscious of what it meant to live in exile far away from a country where justice had been trampled and torn apart by fascism. I was too small when I arrived to Mexico to realize the pain that all of this represented. I learned later that Lázaro Cárdenas was the man who had given a second country and a new nationality to the Spanish refugees. He gave to me the only country I have had, and the other one, the Spanish one, I had lost before even knowing it." (translation)

== Exhibitions ==
The artist has exhibited in various parts of the Mexican Republic, including the Palacio de Bellas Artes in Mexico City. There she has exhibited in three shows: The first one in 1974, Del tapiz a la escultura; later in 1985, Mis caminos son terrestres and finally in 2012, Tránsitos de naualli. She has also had an important artistic presence in the United States, Spain, and in various Latin American countries.

Since 1982, she has organized the Salón Michoacano del Textil en Miniatura ('Michoacan Miniature Textile Salon') with the help of governor Cuauhtémoc Cárdenas Solórzano.

In 1996, Palau Bosch organized the first Salón Internacional de Estandartes ('International Banner Biennial'), which in her words "serves to introduce artists from Baja California to international circles, as representatives of the vigorous cultural movement that has surged on our border during the last ten years." The Salon had its first three editions (1996, 1997, 1998), later converting to a biannual exhibition. The artist was responsible for recovering the use of the banner as a technique to reflect the specific problems inherent in the border. The 2010 Biennial convened 37 artists from Latin America and the United States, with special emphasis on border zones. Also, the format of the banner combined with the particular museography and display required by the Centro Cultural Tijuana imposed new possibilities and technical challenges on the artists. Emilio Carballido comments: "The inventor of everything, Marta Palau, at the Centro Cultural Tijuana, has had to do something new. That's what the art of the world owes them now. And of course the art of Mexico."

In 1998, Palau Bosch conceived and directed an ambitious international show at the Museum of the City of Mexico titled Cinco continentes y una ciudad ('Five Continents and a City'), for which she invited a curator from each continent. This exhibit returned in 2015 for a second edition.

The artist was a member of the consulting group for the Museo de Mujeres Artistas Mexicanas (MUMA) since its formation in 2008, together with artists and art students such as Ana Quiroz, Karen Cordero, Grace Quintanilla and Mónica Mayer. The mission of this museum is to record the history of Mexican women in the visual arts during the 20th Century.

In 2010, Palau Bosch won the Mexican Premio Nacional de Ciencias y Artes in Fine Arts. She resided in Tijuana part of the time, and the other part in Mexico City.

Selection of photographs from the inauguration of the exhibition Tránsitos de Naulli in Portugal, 2014:

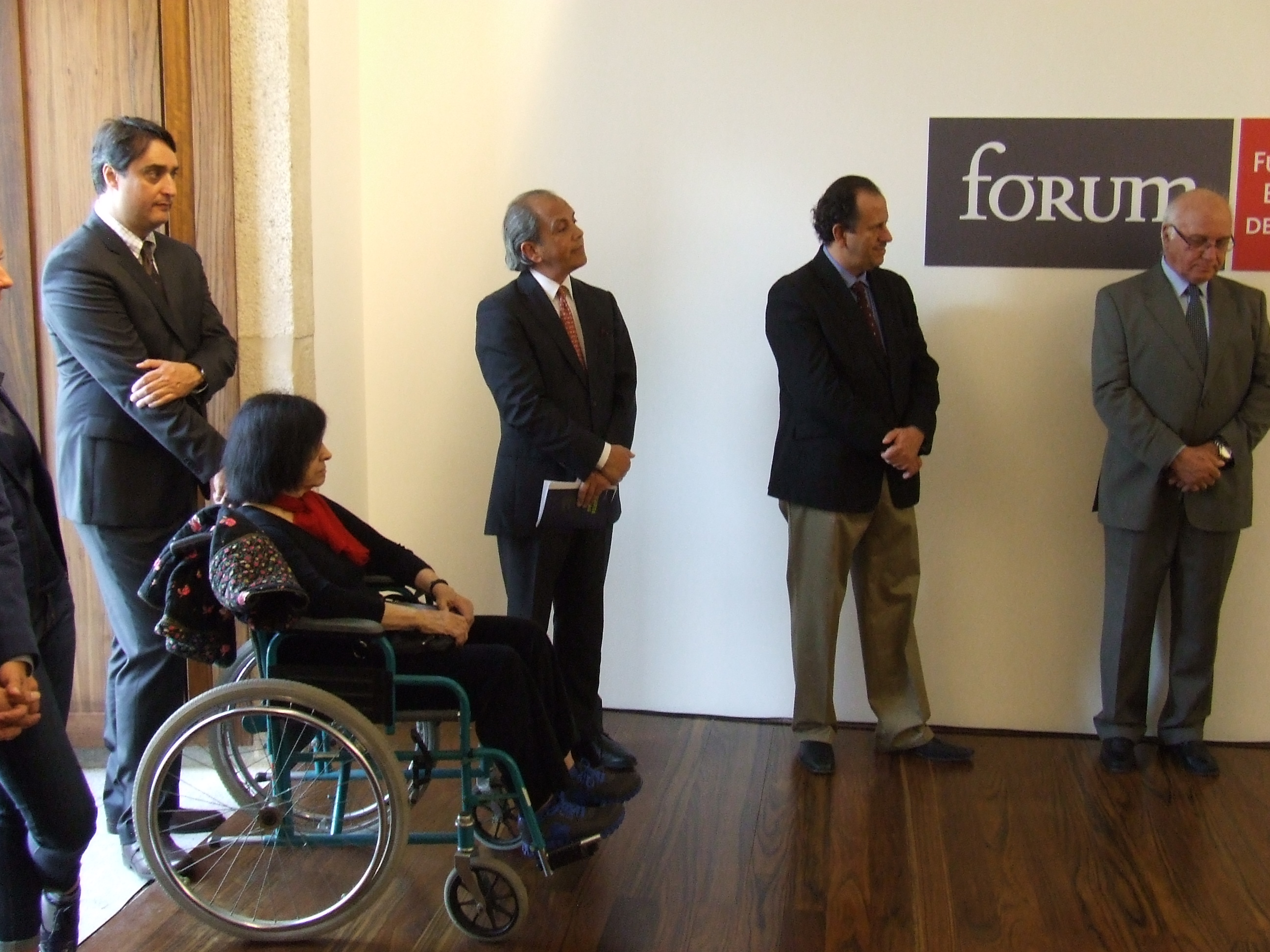

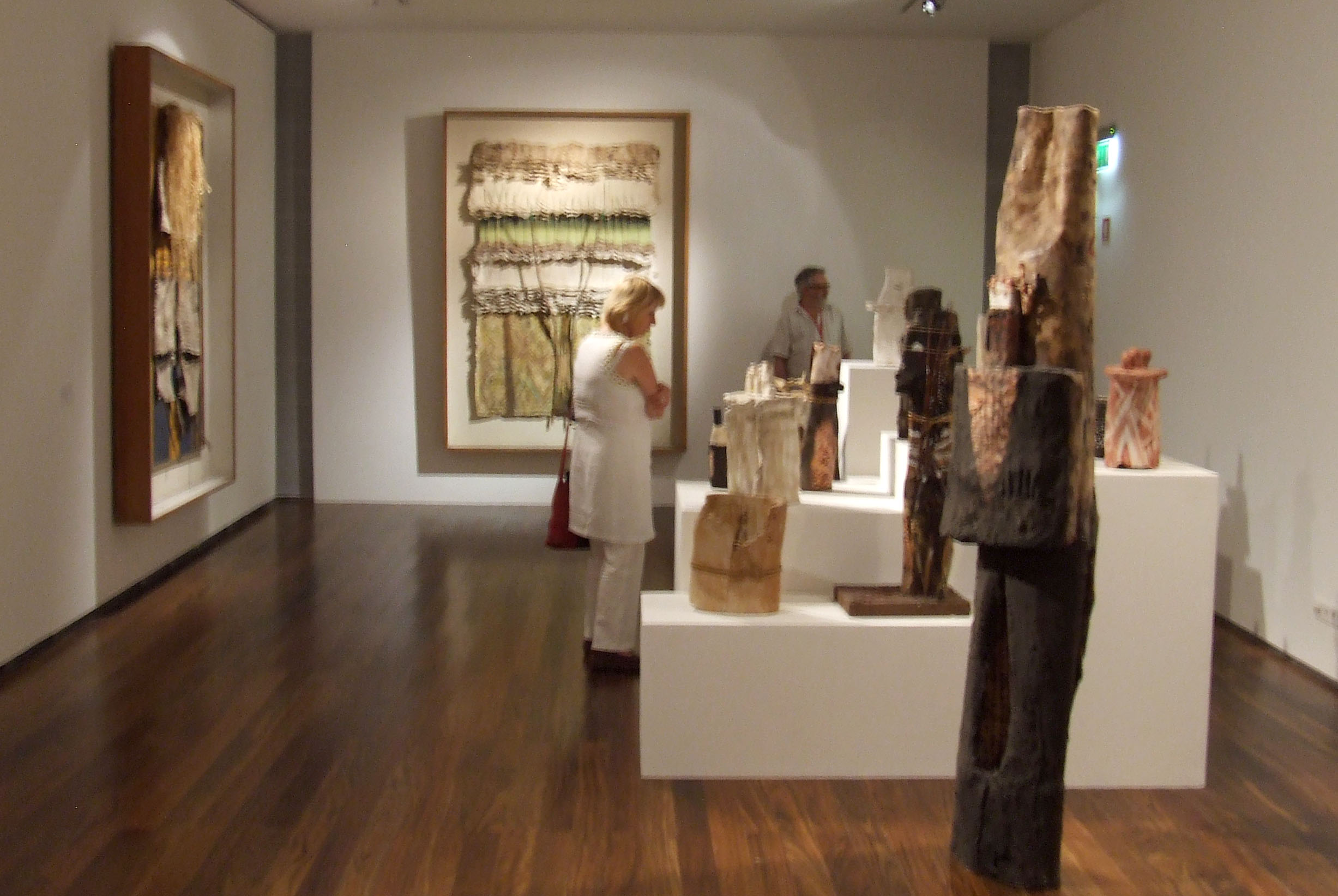

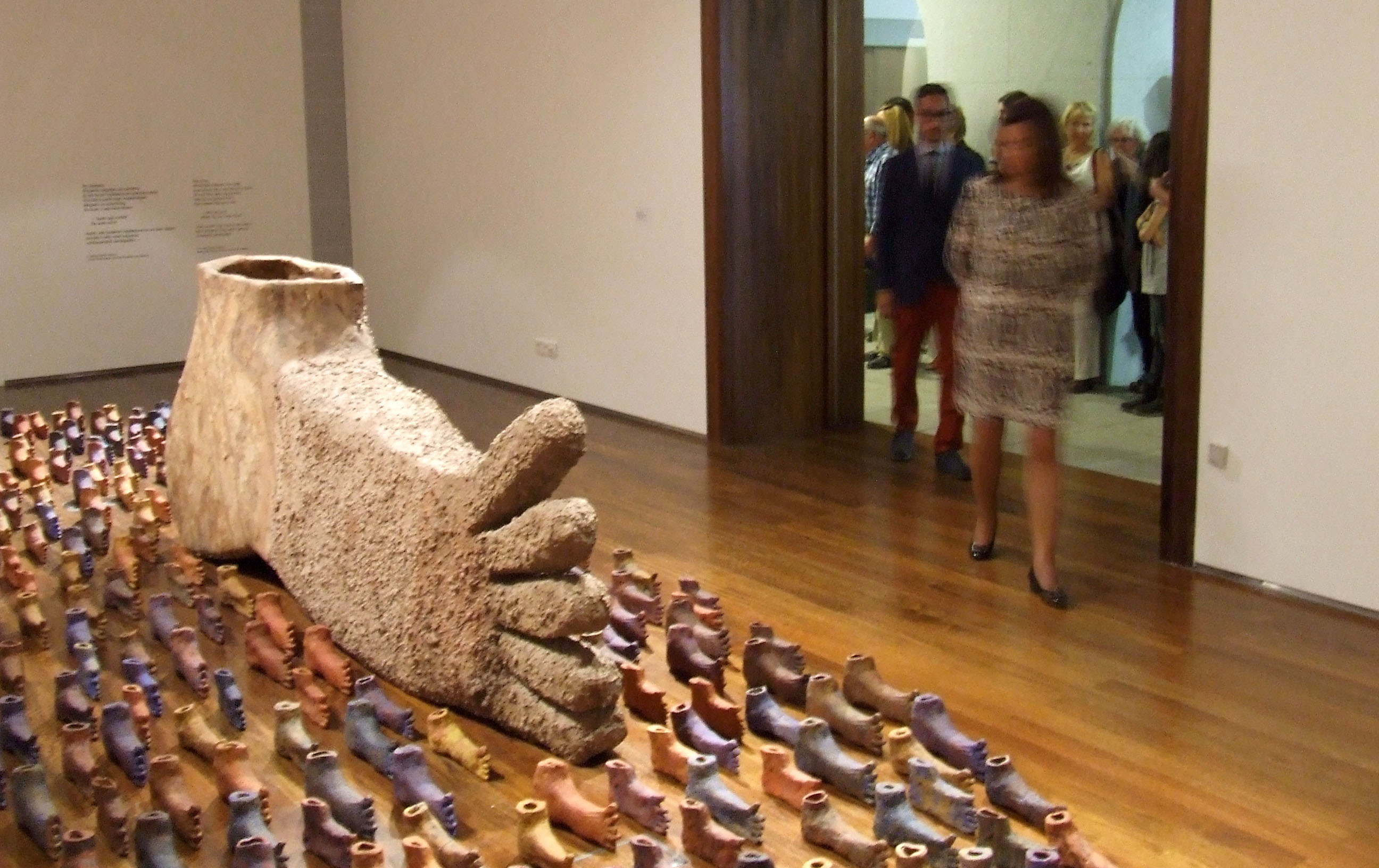

== Artistic technique and materials ==
In addition to tapestry, the artist has made inroads in painting, engraving and ceramics. In order to create her works, she utilizes a mix of elements of land art, abstract expressionism, and pop art. Some of her works reflect her interest in the cave paintings of Baja California. In her tapestries, she uses natural Mexican fibers, and in some of her paintings she uses native Amate paper from Mexico. In incorporating materials such as wire, cord, and fiber into her weaving, Palau and others such as Olga de Amaral, Myra Landau, and Feliciano Béjar, have created "a highly original form of aesthetic expression" specific to Latin America.

The exploration of tapestries serves an important role in her work. After having developed her techniques in engraving, during the 1970s she began to work with weavings, initially beginning with the serape. According to Raquel Tibol, in those years many artists were interested in weaving, which incited Palau Bosch to travel to Barcelona where she met Grau Garriga and assimilated his style. Her reevaluation of tapestry as a medium led to a reconsideration of the division between the artist and the artisan: when the former returns to a technique relegated to the "lower arts", they recover their status as a manual worker. For Tibol, the value of the artist's works woven with henequen, wool or synthetic yarns align them more with the world of sculpture.

Many critics have agreed that in Palau Bosch's tapestries there is an exaltation of sensuality as an artistic value. Her works reflect the influence of Catalan Informalism, a movement that reached its apex at the end of the 1950s and believes in the footprint of the temperament and the wisdom of instinct on artistic language. However, she uses her works to develop ideas around specific themes, such as the critique of censorship and repression of the Franco dictatorship in Los Sellos de la España Sellada ('The Stamps of Stamped Spain') in 1976.

In 1970, the artist participated for the second time in the Salon Independiente, exhibiting Ambientación Alquímica ('Alchemical Atmosphere'), one of her most well known pieces that currently forms part of the standing collection of the Museo Universitario Arte Contemporáneo. It is an open, walk-in structure with movable wooden wall panels and geometric forms made from carton and newsprint, with numbers and syllables painted on it that form the word Tetragramaton. While inside it, the spectator becomes an active and ludic element in the work itself, a concept that had barely begun to be explored in that time. According to the artist, the installation is:

"un talismán de protección y fuerza, en el cual el público participa porque parte de su chiste es que hay que entrar y, al hacerlo, las puertas giran y siempre aparece la misma imagen: un triángulo basado en la alquimia, en el nombre de Dios que no se puede pronunciar, que es Yavé, que está dividida en cuatro letras, que son cuatro sílabas" "a talisman of strength and protection, in which the public participates, because part of the joke is that you have to enter, and upon doing so, the doors revolve and the same image appears over and over: a triangle based in alchemy, in the name of God that should not be spoken, Yahweh, that is divided into 4 letters, that is 4 syllables" (translation)

Her later works consist of installations and tapestries made with natural materials such as coco fibers and dyed corn husks. The ensemble of pieces titled Mis caminos son Terrestres ('My Roads are Lands') has been interpreted by Rita Eder as approaching an identity somewhere between the structure of myth and art.

Of her large-scale installations, some of which have used Amate bark, salt, and earth, Palau Bosch has stated that her use of natural fibers has led to her desire to learn more about native peoples' rituals and practices. She says that "Art begins as ritual magic" and believes that even modern, urbanized peoples continue the traditions of magic in their world.

In her installation Nomadas II, Palau plays with the dimensions of a series of sizes of disembodied outstretched feet, referencing cave paintings made by early humans found in the rockshelters of Baja California.

In Doble Muro, the artist comments on the issue of undocumented immigrants and the proposed border wall between the United States and Mexico, by creating a structure of two walls on a base of wooden columns. Inside, on the floor of the structure is the outline of a human body woven with fibers, surrounded by the 2 symbolical walls, evoking the chalk silhouettes made by police or medical personnel to demarcate the position of a cadaver on the ground.

External videos
- “MUCA 2007: Marta Palau Ambientación Alquímica”, 1 December 2010
- “Los tránsitos de Naualli de Marta Palau", 15 October 2013
- “Marta Palau Revolución(es)" (Interview in Spanish), 19 January 2011

== Themes on the subject of women ==
Her works around the Naualli (Nagual), the feminine figure of the shaman, are characterized by vaginal indents and forms of the vulva that serve as symbols of magic and the curative powers of the female warrior, the witch, or the priestess. The materials she uses in this group of works, vegetable fibers, leaves and dry branches, have been interpreted as a link to the natural and sacred world.

For González Mello, in Recinto de Shamanes ('Shaman's Enclosure') (which in the words of the artist "is like a great vagina representing fertility"), the work problematizes the relationship between "the outside and the inside", dislocating and incommoding the spectator, as in her Ambientación Alquímica – that for certain contains symbols referring to the masculine and the feminine. In the latter work, a structure with a particular "inside" bursts into the architectonic space of the museum and plants a familiar nature, interior and distinct, from the menacing nature that opposes masculine reason.

Palau's work Front-era is a 10-foot-high organic structure consisting of the geometric shapes formed by small ladders woven from twigs. According to curator Rachel Teagle, this work reflects the triangle as a symbol of feminine mysticism, along with a metaphor for immigration, citing that simple ladders were used by immigrants crossing the border between Mexico and the United States during the 1980s.

== Other works ==
Palau has been a stage designer for theatre and dance on numerous occasions. She has worked in conjunction with the dramatist Emilio Carballido, who has written about her work. In 2002, she illustrated Carballido's book Venus-Quetzalcóatl y cinco cuentos. In 2007 and 2014, the artist has participated in exhibitions in honor of Carballido and his artistic works.

In 1995, the artist published a children's book titled Cueva Pintada ('Painted Cave'), published by the Consejo Nacional para la Cultura y las Artes, in conjunction with the Centro Cultural Tijuana and Teléfonos del Noroeste. In the book, she narrates a legend about the pictographic cave paintings in Baja California which are the subject of the accompanying illustrations.

== Exhibitions ==
Selected exhibitions:

- 2014. La raiz. (Homenaje a Emilio Carballido), Centro Cultural de Córdoba, Córdoba, Mexico.
- 2013–2015. Tránsitos de Naualli, Spain, Portugal, Italy.
- 2012. Tránsitos de Naualli, Museo del Palacio de Bellas Artes, México.
- 2010. Four Rooms and a View/Mexican Masters. Fisher Museum of Art, University of Southern California, Los Angeles.
- 2007. Homenaje a Emilio Carballido, Centro Cultural Tijuana, Tijuana, Mexico.
- 2006. Doble muro, instalación, Sala Arte Publico Siqueiros, INBA.
- 2004. Front-era / triángulo. Lo uno y lo múltiple/Todas las guerras, Museum of Contemporary Art, La Jolla, San Diego.
- 2003. Lo uno y lo múltiple, Galería de Arte Contemporáneo y Diseño.
- 2003. Todas las guerras, 3 installations, Fisher Gallery, University of Southern California, Los Angeles.
- 2002. Nómadas II, Universitat de Lleida, Aula Magna, Sala Victor Siurana.
- 2001. Los que quedan -muro transitable-, Museo de las Californias, CECUT, Tijuana.
- 1990. Naualli. Museo de Arte Moderno del Centro Cultural Mexiquense, Toluca, Mexico
- 1985. Mis caminos son terrestres, Sala Nacional, Palacio de Bellas Artes, Mexico
- 1981. Un homenaje artístico a Lázaro Cárdenas, Museo de Arte Moderno.
- 1978. Marta Palau: 30 esculturas en materiales textiles, Museo de Arte Moderno, Mexico City

== Awards and honors ==
- 1986 Best Installation, Havana Biennial, Havana, Cuba.
- 1992 Burgerpreis (Guest Award), 5th Fellbach Triennale, Fellbach, Germany
- 1993, 1997, 2003 Creador Artístico Award, Fondo Nacional para La Cultura y las Artes, Mexico.
- 2010 Premio Nacional de Bellas Artes (Mexico)
- 2008 Orden de la Independencia Cultural Rubén Darío (Nicaragua)
- 2002 Doctorate Honoris Causa Exilí Catalá, Universitat de Lleida (Spain)
- 2018 Medalla Bellas Artes en Artes Visuales, Centro Cultural Tijuana (Mexico)

== Publications ==
- Carballido, Emilio (2004). Venus-Quetzalcóatl y cinco cuentos. Voces de Mexico (in Spanish). Tlanepantla, México: Club de Lectores. ISBN 9681517032. OCLC 912780070. (as illustrator)
- Cueva pintada (in Spanish). Tijuana, Mexico: National Council of Culture and the Arts. 1995. ISBN 9781937421274. OCLC 36284546.
