= Galería La Cometa =

- Established: 1986
- Location: Miami, Bogotá, Medellín, Madrid
- Type: Contemporary art gallery
- Owner: Esteban Jaramillo
- Website: galerialacometa.com

Galería La Cometa is an art gallery with spaces in multiple cities including Miami, United States, Bogotá, Colombia, Medellín, Colombia, and Madrid, Spain.

Founded by Colombian art dealer Esteban Jaramillo, the gallery was inaugurated in Bogotá in 1986. As one of Colombia's oldest galleries operating continuously in contemporary art, the program focuses heavily on artists with ties to Latin America. Galería La Cometa is notable for its significant artist roster and exhibiting artists, including Olga de Amaral, Ai Weiwei, Feliza Bursztyn, Camilo Restrepo, Miguel Ángel Rojas, Glenda León, Jim Amaral, and Ana González.

Galería La Cometa is for its connections with institutions and museums, including the Museo de Arte Moderno in Bogotá, and Museo de Arte Contemporáneo in Bogotá.
