= Yani Pecanins =

Mexican mixed media artist

- Born: 1957; Mexico City, Mexico
- Died: 2019 (aged 61–62); Mexico City, Mexico
- Known for: Book artist, Mixed media

Yani Pecanins (1957–2019) was a Mexican artist. She is known for establishing the Cocina Ediciones publishing project as well as her artist's books and mixed media pieces.

Pecanins was born in 1957 in Mexico City, Mexico. She studied art in Barcelona, Spain, specifically linotype and bookbinding. In 1977 she helped established Cocina Ediciones (Kitchen Editions). Cocina Ediciones created hand-made artist and writer collaborative books, magazines and portfolios. The group used printing presses as well as mimeograph machines, photocopiers and rubber stamps. In 1993 she co-founded the book store El Archivero with Gabriel Macotela and Armando Sáenz Carrillo.

Pecanins died in 2019 at the age of 62 in Mexico City.

Her work is in the National Museum of Women in the Arts, and the Walker Art Center. An online exhibition is included at the Museo de Mujeres Artistas Mexicanas.
