= Simon Lamunière =

Swiss art curator (born 1961)

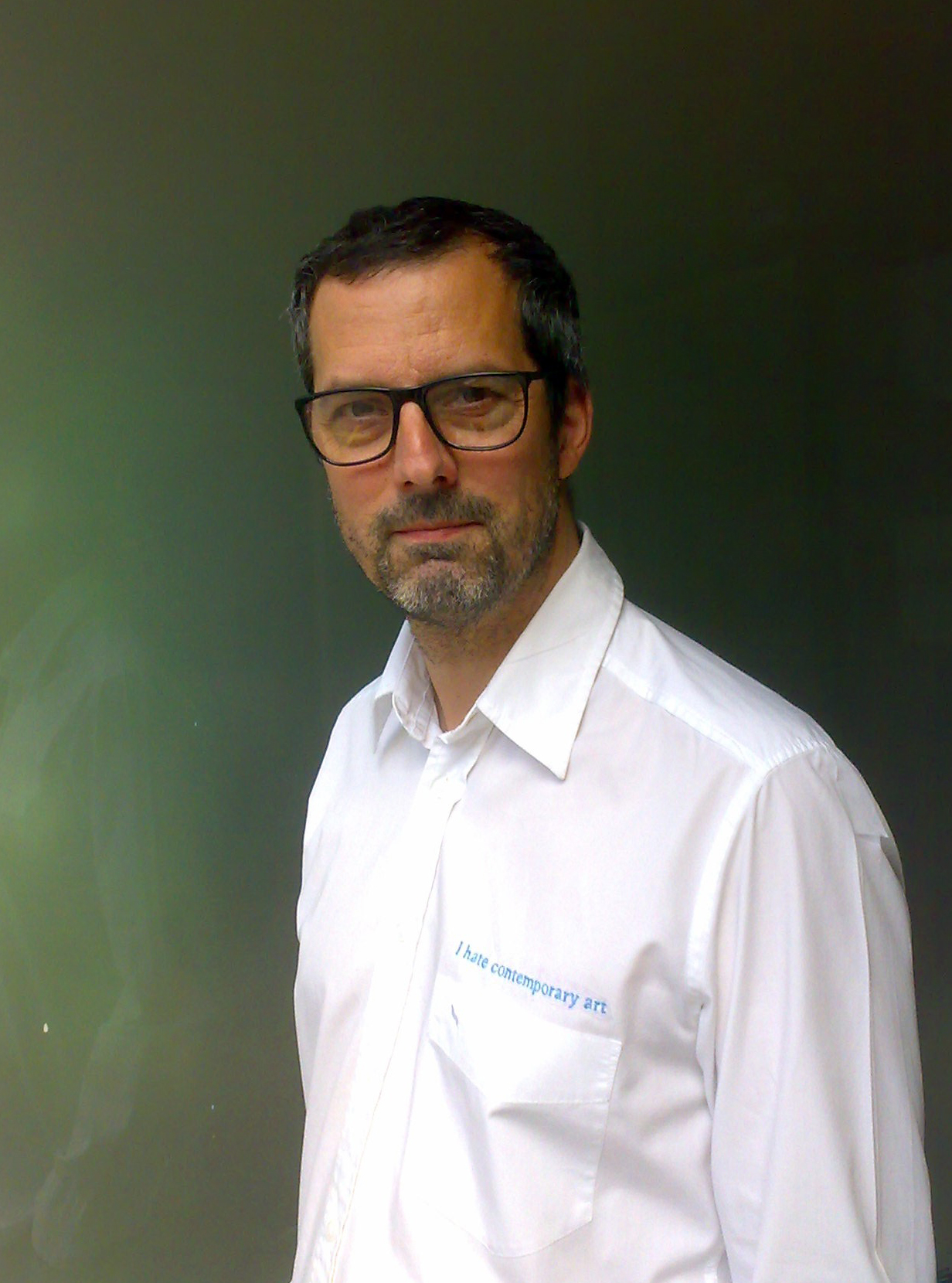
Swiss art curator Simon Lamunière, July 2010

Simon Lamunière (born 1961 in Geneva) is a Swiss contemporary artist, art curator and advisor.

== Career ==
Trained as an artist at the School of Visual Arts in Geneva (today HEAD) followed by a postgraduate course at the Schule für Gestaltung in Basel, Simon Lamunière has received grants for a residence at the Cité internationale des arts in Paris and at the Akademie Schloss Solitude, Stuttgart, and received twice a Swiss Art Award. Between 1987 and 2003, he produced, books, videos, installations and digital art works. He has participated to solo and group shows in Paris, New-York, Lisbonne, Frankfurt and in Switzerland. His last known exhibition as an artist was at the Musée d'Art moderne et contemporain or MAMCO, Geneva, in 2003.

His experience as curator began at the Centre pour l'image contemporaine (CIC) in 1987 with the International Video Week, one of the first video festivals in Switzerland and Europe.

In 2000 he was appointed curator of Art|Unlimited at Art Basel, a function he held until 2011.

Since 2007, Lamuniere conceived a large public art project and was the project manager of Neon Parallax within the (FMAC) and the Canton Contemporary Art Fund (FCAC) of Geneva. Located on the largest public square of Geneva, this site-specific art project invited Swiss and international artists to create luminous artworks and neon signs for building roofs in the same way as advertising signs are placed on the Geneva lakeside. The project has been awarded the swiss Prix Visarte 2017.

In 2009, Simon Lamunière was the Director of "Utopics""(interview), the 11th Swiss Exhibition of Sculptures, a quinquennial exhibition launched in 1954 by Marcel Joray in the field of contemporary art in public space in Biel/Bienne in the Canton of Bern.

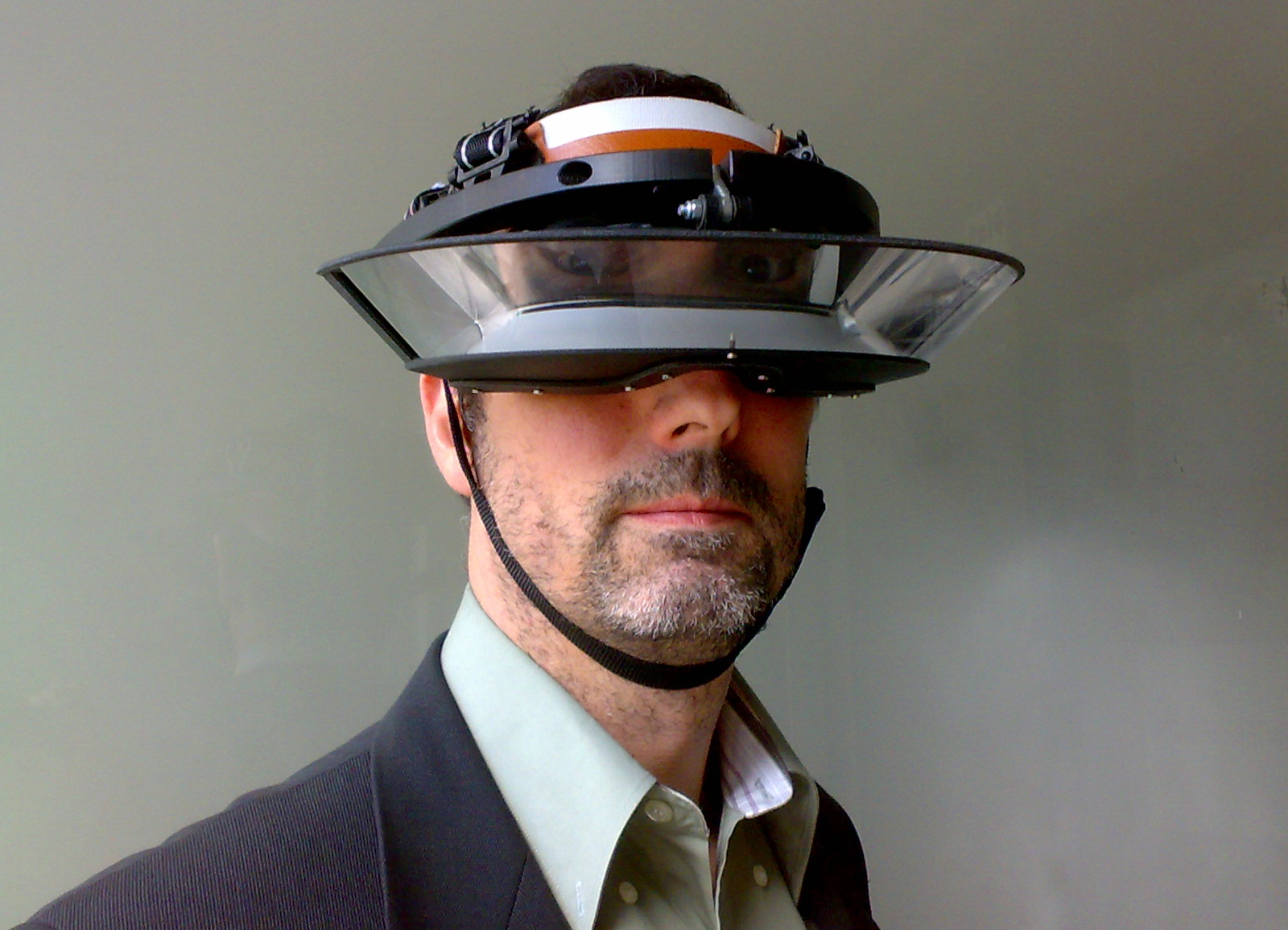
Curator Simon Lamunière wearing Carsten Hoeller Upside Down Goggles, 2009

Lamunière is known for expanding usual exhibition contexts and developing large scale projects. He has for example co-curated site-specific or public art exhibitions in particular locations such as a cemetery for Open End.

From 2020 to 2023 he has directed OPEN HOUSE an exhibition on temporary housing in the fields of design, architecture, art and humanitarian aid. 35 shelters and pavilions were shown by Swiss and international participants among which Andrea Zittel, Atelier Van Lieshout, Carla Juaçaba, Didier Faustino, Frida Escobedo, Ken Isaacs, Kerim Seiler, Lang/Baumann, Matti Suuronen's Futuro, Rahbaran Hürzeler Architects.
