= Dolores Dembus Bittleman =

American artist (born 1931)

Dolores Dembus Bittleman (born 1931) is an American fiber artist and art conservator. Bittleman's work includes fiber and silk tapestries. Bittleman is in the collection of the Museum of Modern Art (MoMA), where she has been featured in several exhibitions. Bittleman has also shown at the Lausanne International Tapestry Biennial and the Everson Museum of Art in Syracuse, New York.

Bittleman studied with Anni Albers at Yale University. Bittleman exhibited at Bennington College in 1968. Bittleman was married to artist and educator Arnold Bittleman.

== See also ==
- Fibre Art
- Wall Hangings
