= Jim Amaral =

American-born Colombian artist (born 1933)

- Born: John James Amaral; March 3, 1933 (age 93); Pleasanton, California
- Known for: Painting, sculpture, graphics
- Spouse: Olga de Amaral (current)
- Website: http://jimamaral.art

Jim Amaral (born 3 March 1933) is an American-born Colombian artist known for his drawings and bronze sculptures. Over a career that spans more than half a century, Amaral has also worked on painting, etchings, collages, furniture design, assemblages/objects, and artist's books. He has been recognized for his draughtsmanship and refined technique. While his work does not necessarily belong to a style or movement, it has been linked to surrealism and ancient Greek sculpture. Amaral has stated of his work: "I am only trying to understand the world, to live through my painting. I am trying to understand certain mysteries, such as the energies of life and death, the loneliness of a man ... I paint what people can reflect upon, so that what stays with the spectator is not only the visual impact".

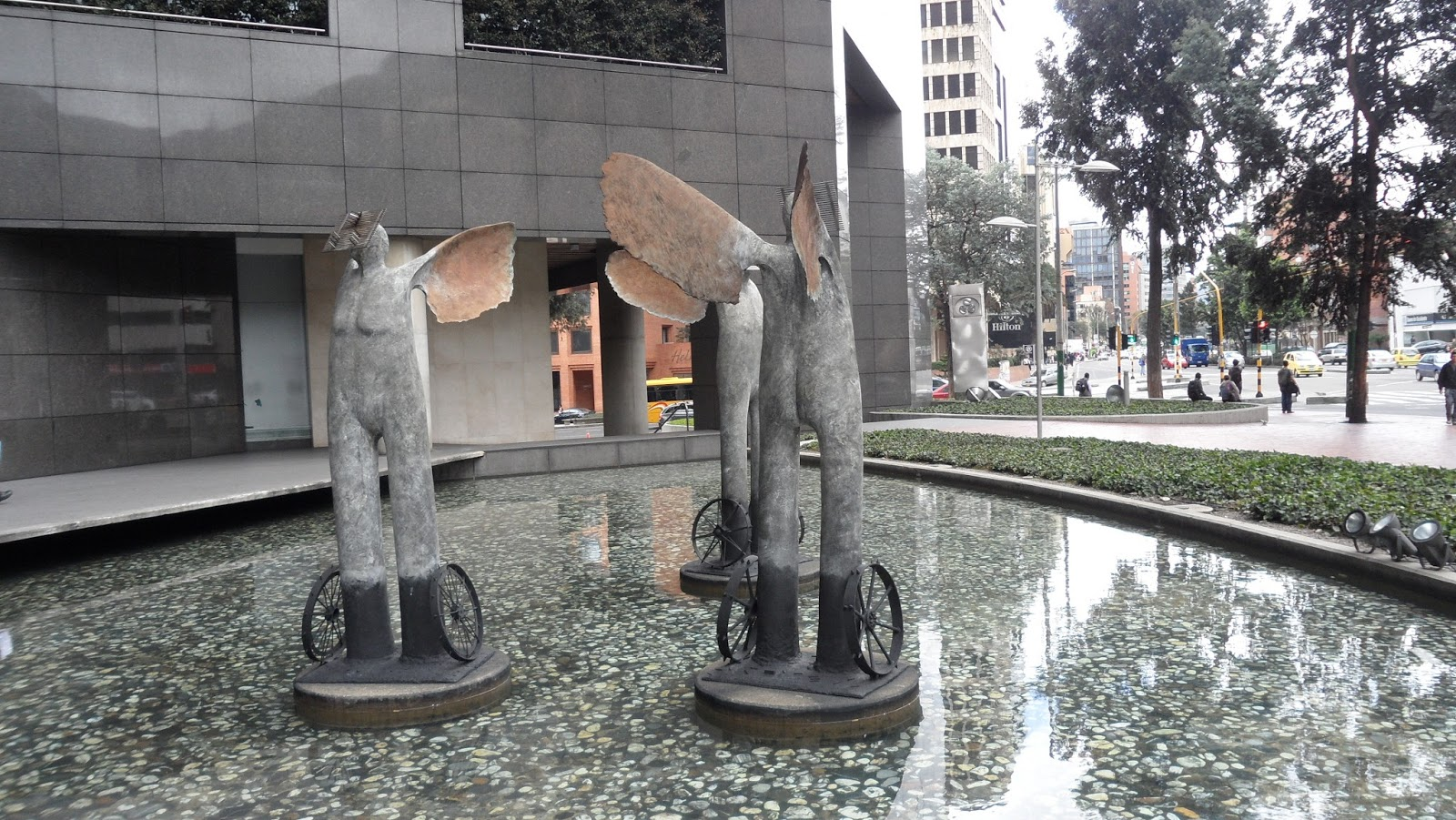
Jim Amaral, Women with wheels; 1994; bronze; Carrera Séptima with Calle 72, in front of the Bolsa de Valores building

In 2013–2014, he was chosen to produce the graphic imagery for the VIII Cartagena International Music Festival in Colombia, organised by the Salvi Foundation. His large scale bronze sculptures are located outdoors in different sites in Bogotá, Colombia, such as in the garden of the National Museum and, since 1996, at the entrance to the Bolsa de Valores de Colombia BVC on Carrera Séptima (3 bronze sculptures Women with wheels, 1994). In 2013 the artist published a calendar called Aguas Turbias with a collection of 14 drawings from a series with the same title.

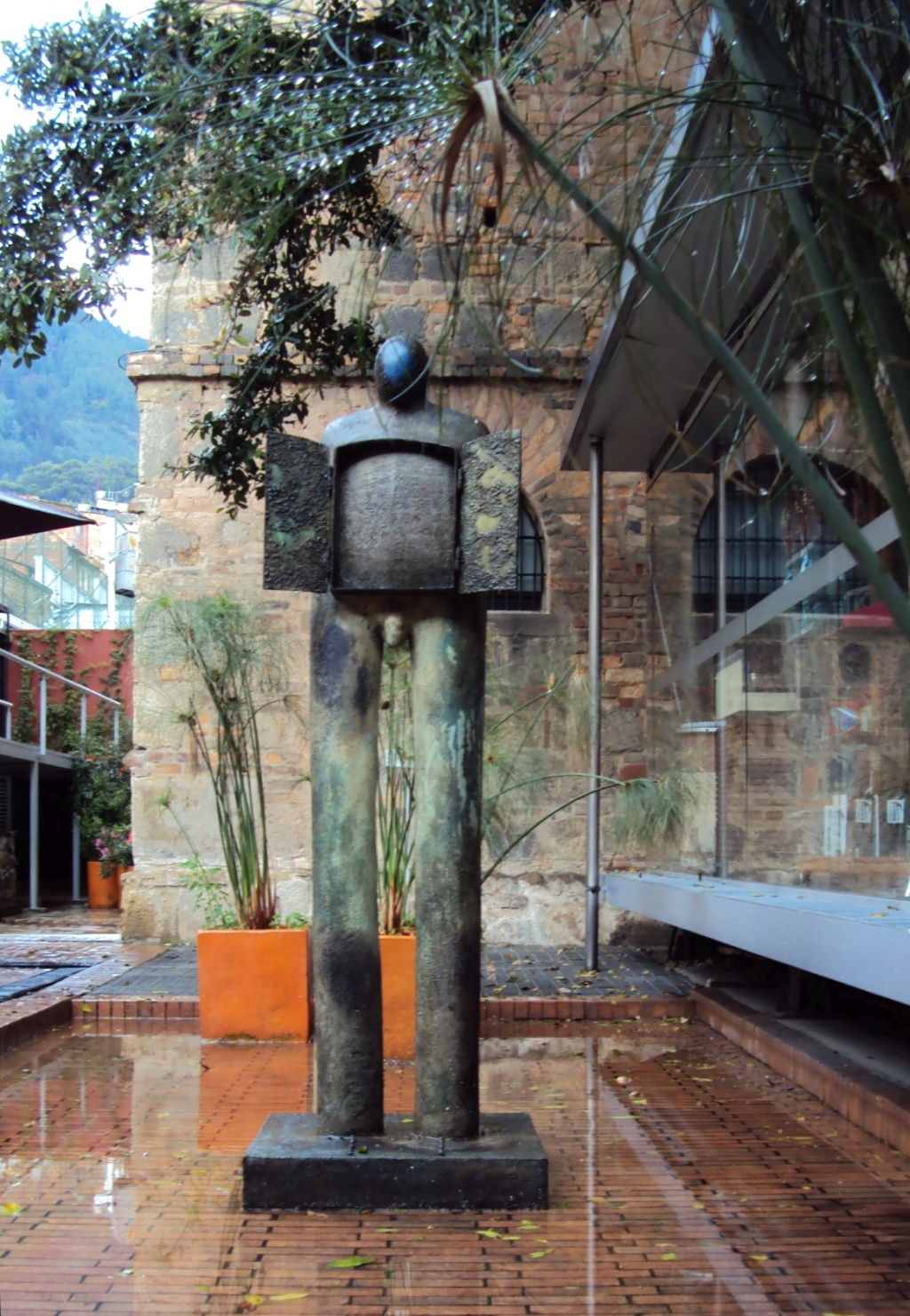
Jim Amaral "Doored chest", 2000, bronze. The Sculpture Garden in The National Museum, Bogotá, Colombia (permanent collection)

== Biography and education ==
Amaral was born in 1933 in Pleasanton, California, USA. His father was Portuguese and his mother was American of Italian descent. Amaral grew up in a rural environment in Pleasanton and remembers that period as "living in an interior exile". As a teenager he wrote poetry.

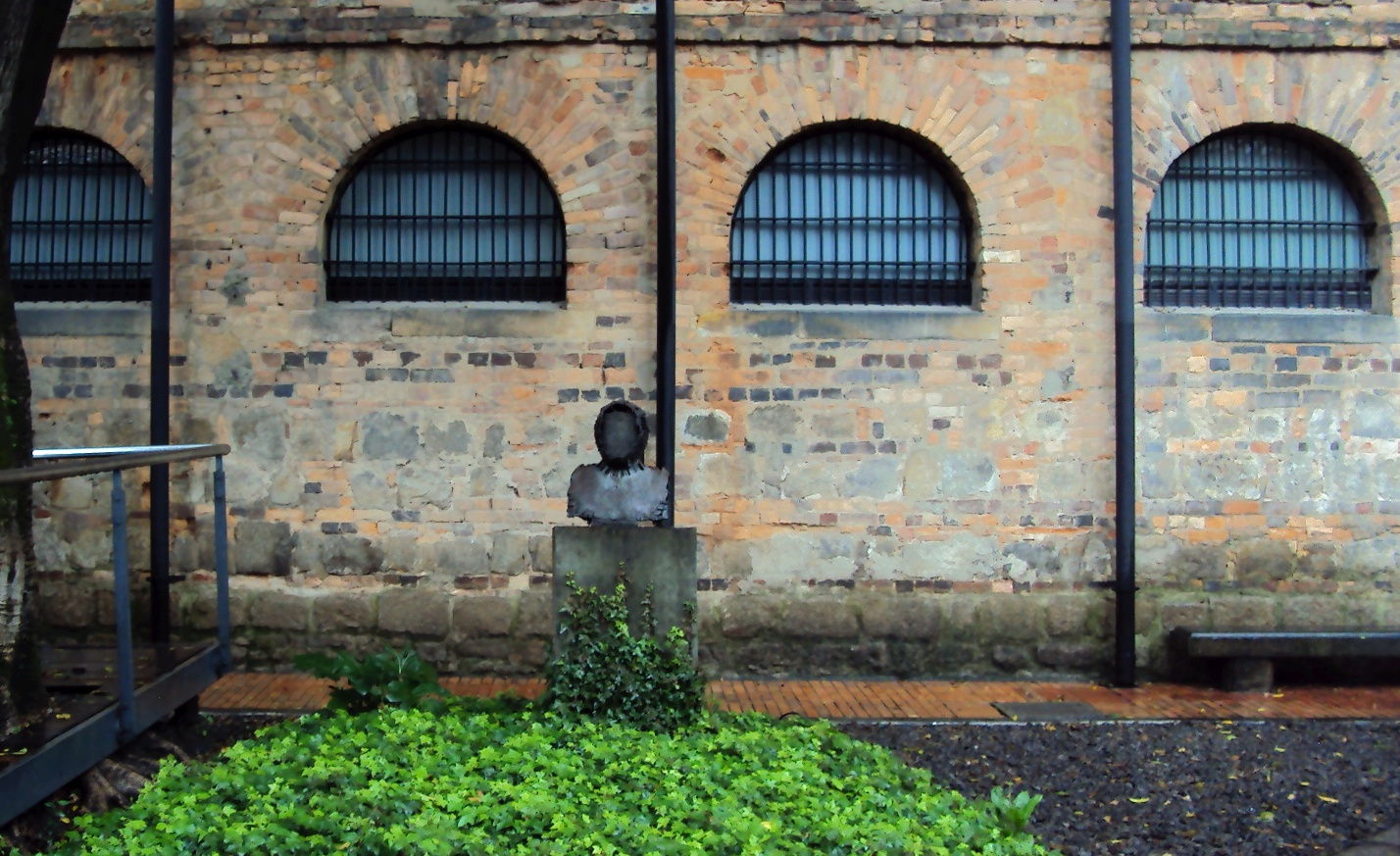
Jim Amaral "Shield Nº 6", 1993, bronze. The Sculpture Garden in The National Museum, Bogotá, Colombia (permanent collection).

He studied for two years at the University of Washington, Seattle (1952–53), covering subjects including the history of art and architecture. In 1954 he graduated with a bachelor of arts degree at Stanford University, and decided on a career in the arts. He continued his postgraduate studies at the Cranbrook Academy of Art in Bloomfield Hills, Michigan (1954-55), where he met the Colombian visual artist Olga de Amaral, whom he married in Colombia in December 1957.

From 1955 to 1957, he completed military service in the Philippines with the U.S. Navy. In 1958 he moved to Bogotá, where he started working with a furniture and interior design company. Following the birth of his son, Amaral decided to become a full-time artist. He began casting bronze sculptures and making collages and abstract drawings. In 1960 his daughter was born. From 1966 to 1967 the Amaral family moved temporarily to New York. In 1967, after moving back to Colombia, Amaral traveled to the US again to teach drawing at the Penland School of the Arts and Crafts in North Carolina. In the same year he also started teaching drawing at the Universidad Jorge Tadeo Lozano in Bogotá. In the years 1970-1972 the Amaral family traveled around Europe, settling down for a longer period in Paris, where in the fall of 1971, at the Albert Loeb gallery, Amaral showed his work for the first time in Europe. The exhibition brought him critical acclaim. He traveled to Paris again for longer periods in 1974-1975 and 1979-1980. In 1989 Amaral taught drawing at the University of California, Los Angeles (UCLA). Currently he lives with his wife in Bogotá and works in Casa Amaral.

== Works ==
=== Early career in the 1960s and 1970s ===
In his first solo show in 1962 at the Vorpal Gallery in San Francisco, Amaral exhibited small ink drawings humorously depicting erotic themes. This took place as cultural attitudes towards sex were changing. Amaral experienced depression during this period, and a psychoanalytic treatment resulted in a series of "psychological" drawings.

In 1964, he had his first solo show in Colombia, in Galería El Callejón, where he exhibited drawings, collages and oil paintings. Toward the end of the 1960s, Amaral worked increasingly with erotic themes and in 1970 participated in a group exhibition entitled El erotismo en el arte at the Galería Belarca in Bogotá. In 1972, at the same gallery, he showed drawings in a new technique that he started to develop earlier in Paris - a mix of pencil and watercolour on paper treated previously with gesso.

During the 1970s Amaral exhibited in France, Italy, Sweden, Germany, and Belgium. During his Parisian period, he found popularity and acclaim from authors like Jacques Leenhardt and José Pierre. His drawings from the 1970s often treat subjects in an erotic and sensual manner with a realistic style. He said: "I hear people saying that my artworks are erotic. I don't think so. But then I am surprised - almost confused - when I see how annoyed people get when they see a penis". He typically depicts fragmented body parts, human sexual organs, flowers that bloom lips or ears as petals, and biomorphic beings. Invisible Flowers is a key work from this period; its title alludes to Invisible Cities, written by his friend Italo Calvino. His work from this period also includes surrealist-influenced collages and assemblages with antique boxes, old photographs, antique books, and antique colonial furniture.

=== Painting in the 1980s ===
In 1980 Amaral returned to Bogotá. In the following two decades he worked with oil and acrylic paint, rendering meditative compositions with shadowed and earthy palettes. These include a series titled Mourning Fruit, which uses dried and mummified fruits placed on patterned surfaces with celestial bodies hanging in the sky. He said: "My paintings are dense, they have layers and layers of acrylic paint; thus, as I saturate the space, the possibility of the void expands (...) The fruit is a contradiction, because although itself it means life, at the same time it is dry, soft or stony, that is to say, lonely". The works reflect on death, decay and the passage of time.

=== Sculpture in the 1990s ===
In his early career, Amaral experimented with a variety of visual arts. In 1959 he had begun to make sculptures, but he found the process and the effects disappointing, so turned instead to collages and drawing. In 1989, on a trip with his wife Olga de Amaral to an exhibition site in Santa Fe, New Mexico, USA, he discovered the Shidoni Foundry and began to create new sculptures.

His cire-perdue bronzes from this period are characterized by mythological themes, metamorphosis, death, the human condition and the mysteries of the cosmos. His figures are often depicted with small heads, absent facial features, and gender ambiguities. The sensuality that characterized his earlier two-dimensional creations are reflected in the textures and refined patinas of his bronzes, in which he also explores solidity and monumentality. Eduardo Serrano considered the creatures rendered in these bronzes as expectant and concerned for the future with “composed anxiety.” William Ospina found irony in the sculptures.

=== Cuerpos pintados ===
In 2003 a Chilean photographer, Roberto Edwards, invited Amaral to participate in his non-profit project Taller experimental. Cuerpos pintados (painted bodies). Amaral decided to work with midgets from Santiago. hE painted the bodies of his models and characterised them as if they were angels, demons and cupids spreading love. In another, later series, he transformed them in live versions of some of his sculptures. The project aimed to appreciate the diversity of the human body.

=== Recent work ===
More recently, Amaral has focused on watercolor and ink drawings, artist's books, and single-edition bronze sculptures. His bronzes have, in recent years, made a departure from human and animal figures towards desolate geometrical landscapes, ashen carts, and timeless machines that appear simultaneously futuristic and archaic.

== Exhibitions ==
=== Selected solo ===
- 2016 Chariots of Humankind. Galerie Agnes Mosplaisir, Paris, France.
- 2015 Tiempos del nunca, Galería La Cometa, Bogotá, Colombia.
- 2014 La oreja pasiva y otras fabulas, Museo de Arte Moderno de Cartagena, Colombia.
- 2011 Islas Imaginarias, Cámara de Comercio de Bogotá, Bogotá, Colombia.
- 2009 Presencia, Centro Cultural Corp Banca, Caracas, Venezuela.
- 2008 Meridianos, Galería La Cometa, Bogotá, Colombia.
- 2007 Medusas, Casa Amaral, Bogota, Colombia.
- 2004 Trans/figuraciones 1960-2004, Retrospective exhibition curated by Jose Roca, Biblioteca Luis Ángel Arango, Banco de la República, Bogotá, Colombia.
- 2002 No-men: bronzes, Peyton Wright Gallery, Santa Fe, New Mexico, USA.
- 2000 New Sculpture, Peyton Wright Gallery, Santa Fe, New Mexico, USA.
- 1998 Monólogos, Galería Uno, Caracas, Venezuela.
- 1993 Galeria der Brücke, Buenos Aires, Argentina.
- 1992 New Bronzes, Shidoni Contemporary Gallery, May to June, Tesuque, New Mexico, USA.
- 1991 Soliloquies, Sculptures, Shidoni Contemporary Gallery, Santa Fe, New Mexico, USA.
- 1988 Pinturas y Mesas, Galería Garcés Velásquez, Bogotá, Colombia.
- 1983 Metamorfosis (a retrospective exhibition), Museo de Arte Moderno, Bogotá, Colombia.; J.Amaral: La vida es una transformación transitoria, XVII São Paulo Biennale, São Paulo, Brazil.
- 1980 Floralies, Galerie Albert Loeb, Paris, France.
- 1979 Pitture di Jim Amaral, Galleria del naviglio, Milan, Italy.
- 1978 Amaral, Galerie Levy, Hamburg, Germany.
- 1977 Galerie Octave Negru, Paris, France.
- 1976 Amaral: Landscape of an absent finger, Galería Belarca, Bogotá, Colombia.
- 1975 Galeria Belarca, Bogota, Colombia.
- 1974 Amaral: Oeuvres Recentes, Galerie Albert Loeb, Paris, France.
- 1973 Galerie Albert Loeb, Paris, France.
- 1971 Amaral, Galerie Albert Loeb, Paris, France.
- 1969-1970 Jim Amaral: dibujos a lápiz, Galería Buchholz, Bogota, Colombia.
- 1968 Jim Amaral: Drawings in the Graphics Corridor, Arleigh Gallery, San Francisco, California, USA.
- 1966 Jim and Olga Amaral, Museo de Bellas Artes, Caracas, Venezuela; Galería Colseguros, Bogotá, Colombia.
- 1964 Jim Amaral: Dibujos, Collages, Oleos, Galería El Callejón, Bogotá, Colombia.
- 1962 Vorpal Gallery, San Francisco, California, USA.

=== Selected group ===
- 2014 Paper Trail, Latin American Masters Gallery, Los Angeles, CA, USA.
- 2012-13 Inmigrantes: Artistas, arquitectos, fotografos, criticos y galeristas en el Arte Colombiano 1930-1970, travelling exhibition Fundación Gilberto Alzate, Museo de Bogota, Biblioteca Luis Angel Arango, Bogotá, Colombia.
- 2012 Grandes maestros, Galería El Museo, Bogotá, Colombia.
- 2007 Formas Divergentes: una mirada a la escultura colombiana de entre-siglos, Montealegre Galería de Arte, Bogota, Colombia.
- 2003 Microcosmos (sculptures), Galería Galena, Bogotá, Colombia.
- 2002 Art Miami, Miami, Florida with Juan Ruiz Gallery, Maracaibo, Venezuela; Homage to New York, Galeria La Cometa, Bogotá, Colombia.
- 2001 La Bandera: Exposición Homenaje, Galeria La Cometa, Bogota, Colombia; Art Palm Beach, Palm Beach, Florida, USA with Galeria El Museo, Bogotá, Colombia; Chicago International Art Fair, Chicago, Illinois, USA with Galeria El Museo, Bogotá, Colombia; Toronto Art Fair, Toronto, Canada with Galeria El Museo, Bogotá, Colombia.
- 2000 San Francisco International Art Fair, San Francisco, California, USA with Galeria El Museo, Bogotá, Colombia.
- 1998 The Homecoming: Jim Amaral New Sculpture and Jeff Bertoncino New Paintings, Peyton Wright Gallery, Santa Fe, New Mexico, USA.
- 1996 V Feria Iberoamericana de arte FIA'96, Caracas, Venezuela with Galeria El Museo, Bogotá, Colombia.
- 1994 Latin American Artists, Lowe Museum, Miami, USA.
- 1993 Colombian Sculpture I, Colombian Center, New York, NY, USA..
- 1991 Masters of Painting, Permanent Mission of Colombia to the United Nations, Colombian Center, New York, NY, USA.
- 1990 Grandes Obras-Grandes maestros, Galeria El Museo, Bogotá, Colombia.
- 1989 Feria Internacional de Arte Contemporáneo ARCO ’89, Galeria El Museo, Madrid, Spain; Donation Daniel Cordier, Centre Pompidou, Paris, France; Museo de Arte Moderno de Bogotá, Bogotá, Colombia.
- 1987 Tres Decadas de Maestros 1960-1980, Galeria Diners, Bogotá, Colombia.
- 1986 Cien años de arte en Colombia, Museo de Arte Moderno, Bogotá, Colombia.; Palacio Imperial, Rio de Janeiro, Brazil.; Centro Cultural Paulista, São Paulo, Brazil.; Centro Cultural Italo-Latinoamericano, Rome, Italy.
- 1979 Musee d’Art Moderne, Atelier Lacouriere & Frelaut, Paris, France.
- 1978 Drawn and Matched, Museum of Modern Art, New York, New York, USA.; Galerie Sylvie Bourdon, Paris, France.
- 1976 Galerie Maia, Bruxelles, Belgium.
- 1975 XXII Biennale Internazionale d’arte: Aspetti dell arte fantastica oggi, Florence, Italy.
- 1973 32 artistas colombianos de hoy, Museo de Arte Moderno, Bogotá, Colombia.
- 1972 Galerie Alfonse Chave, Vence, France.; Galerie Maia, Bruxelles, Belgium.; Art Basel, Galerie Albert Loeb, Basel, Switzerland.
- 1968 Eve Goldschmidt Gallery, New York, NY, USA.

== Collections ==
- Centre Pompidou, Paris, France
- Museum of Modern Art, New York, New York, USA
- Museo de Bellas Artes, Caracas, Venezuela
- Banco de la República, Bogotá, Colombia
- Museo de Arte Moderno, Bogotá, Colombia
- Museo de Arte Contemporáneo, Bogota, Colombia
- Museo Nacional, Bogota, Colombia
- Museo Universidad Nacional, Bogotá, Colombia
- La Tertulia Museum, Cali, Colombia
