= Evelyn Anselevicius =

American textile artist (1923–2003)

- Born: Evelyn Jane Hill; 1923; Hobart, Oklahoma
- Died: July 2, 2003 (aged 79–80); Plainview, Texas
- Education: Black Mountain College, Institute of Design
- Known for: Weaving, Textile design
- Movement: Modernism, Good Design
- Spouse: George Anselevicius

Evelyn Anselevicius (née Hill; 1923–2003) was an American textile artist best known for her large-scale, geometric woven tapestries, often created using Mexican techniques and traditions.

== Early life and education ==
Evelyn Anselevicius was born in Hobart, Oklahoma as Evelyn Jane Hill. She grew up in the Texas Panhandle.

In 1947, she attended Black Mountain College in Western North Carolina, studying under former Bauhaus design professor Josef Albers.

Afterwards she attended the Institute of Design in Chicago, where she met her husband, the architect George Anselevicius, whom she married in May 1954. Her training as a weaver also included an apprenticeship under Majel (Midge) Chance Obata.

== Career ==
Evelyn Anselevicius worked for Knoll Textiles in the 1950s. A handweaving studio was set up there under Anselevicius' direction, broadening the scope of designs that Knoll could translate into machine-loomed fabrics.

As an independent weaver, her work focused on large-scale, monumental tapestries with geometric designs and patterns, and bold use of color. She often made use of wool spun and dyed in Mexico, Mexican rug techniques, and the inclusion of beaded objects. For several years she worked out of a studio in San Miguel de Allende, Mexico, where she employed local weavers. She later moved her studio to Albuquerque.

There are no inhibiting factors regarding the use of pure color in fabric design. Color is used relatively, as it is in painting. Even radiant pinks and orange may be used if used in proportion to the surrounding space—and in relation to the surrounding colors. Colors often remind me of sounds—high and low, loud and soft.

— Evelyn Anselevicius, 1953, quoted in Design Since 1945

== Exhibitions and collections ==
Some of the designs Anselevicius produced for Knoll during the 1950s (as Evelyn Hill) were included in the 1952 exhibition Good Design at the Museum of Modern Art in New York City. Her independent work was included in the exhibition Wall Hangings at the Museum of Modern Art in 1969 and twice at the International Bienniale of Tapestry at Lausanne, Switzerland. In 1971, Anselevicius' works were shown at the newly opened Ruth Kaufmann Gallery located in New York City.

Her work is held in collections worldwide, including the Black Mountain College Museum + Arts Center, the Cooper Hewitt Design Museum, the Museum of Arts and Design, the Museum of Modern Art, the Philadelphia Museum of Art, and the Rodin Museum.
