= George Anselevicius =

American architect

George Anselevicius (June 5, 1923 – October 2, 2008) was a Lithuanian-born American architect.

A native of Lithuania born in 1923, Anselevicius moved to England in 1938 to further his education. Anselevicius completed his degree at the School of Architecture in Leeds in 1946, and settled in the United States in 1947. He worked as a designer for Skidmore, Owings & Merrill in Chicago, as well as Minoru Yamasaki in Detroit. Anselevicius began teaching at the IIT Institute of Design in 1949. He remained on the faculty for three years, then returned to architectural practice. In 1957, Anselevicius accepted an assistant professorship at Washington University in St. Louis. In St. Louis, Anselevicius met Roger Montgomery, with whom he established an architecture firm, Anselevicius and Montgomery, which won several awards for projects in the St. Louis area. Anselevicius was promoted to associate professor at Washington University in 1959, and full professor in 1962. He was dean of architecture from 1968 to 1973, although he first assumed the duties in 1967 in an acting capacity.

In 1973, Anselevicius joined the Graduate School of Design at Harvard University as chair of the architecture department. Though appointed to the position for seven years, Anselevicius resigned and left Harvard after two years to become chair of the Department of Architecture at the State University of New York at Buffalo. At Buffalo, Harold L. Cohen succeeded John Eberhard as Dean of the School of Architecture. Anselevicius helped Cohen gain accreditation for the School of Architecture. Between 1981 and 1993, Anselevicius served as dean of the University of New Mexico School of Architecture and Planning. In retirement, he continued to teach studio courses at UNM where he continued challenging and delighting architecture students with advice, “Just make it (the stair, the facade, a garden) beautiful”, and when a student got stuck on an irrelevant detail, “Whatever, whatever.”

== Personal life ==
Anselevicius naturalized as a citizen of the United States in 1954, and married Evelyn Hill in May of that year. Evelyn Anselevicius died in 2003. in 2008, George Anselevicius fell at home in Albuquerque, New Mexico, and sought treatment at the University of New Mexico Hospital, where he died on October 2, 2008. His loss was deeply mourned by the New Mexico architecture community, and by former colleagues and associates worldwide.
