= Wil Fruytier =

Dutch textile artist (1915–2007)

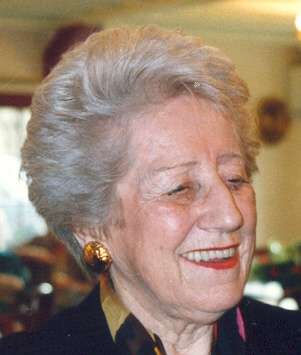
- Wil Fruytier in 1994
- Born: 14 January 1915; Amsterdam
- Died: 13 June 2007 (aged 92)
- Website: https://www.wilfruytier.com/

Wil Fruytier, born Wilhelmina Elisabeth Maria van der Lande, (14 January 1915 – 13 June 2007) was a Dutch textile artist who lived and worked in Amsterdam.

She was particularly productive between 1950 and 1980. She is considered one of the pioneers of textile art. Originally she made woven tapestries. Her strongest rope tapestries are made of rough cables. She called herself a "textile architect" because she aimed at a spatial creation with her large tapestries.

In 1961 she participated in the Venice Biënnale with patchwork quilts.

Her work is represented in the collections of, among others: TextielMuseum, the Cultural Heritage Agency of the Netherlands (Amersfoort/Rijswijk), Delta Lloyd Amsterdam, TU Eindhoven, Bouwfonds art collection.

== Private life ==
Wil Frutier was born on 14 January 1915 in Deventer as the eldest child in a Roman Catholic family of 7 children. She was the daughter of manufacturer-merchant Antonius (Anton) Lebuïnus Maria van der Lande (1890–1981) and Elisabeth Maria Antonia van den Bogaert (1892–1971). Anton van der Lande managed, among other things, the Helmond textile company Hatéma in the thirties. At the age of fifteen, Fruytier went to the Catholic girls' boarding school Notre Dame des Anges in Ubbergen for two years. On 9 November 1940 she married the lawyer Pieter Fruytier, son of Leonardus Albertus Fruytier, former governor of Curaçao. From the marriage, dissolved on 21 December 1966, 3 daughters were born. From the early seventies Fruytier had a living-apart relationship with architect Ben Kraaijvanger.

== Career ==
In her younger years, Wil Fruytier drew and painted a lot. In 1957, Fruytier started making patchworks as an autodidact, initially gluing patches in compositions onto a base. In the same year, she was asked to exhibit a patchwork in the Rotterdam Art Circle and this was the start of her career. An assignment to design a tapestry in 1961 brought her into contact with weaving. She started experimenting with weaving different materials, such as rope, cotton and polypropylene.
