= Carolyn Crump =

American quilt-making artist (born 1960)

- Born: 1960 (age 65–66); Detroit, Michigan, U.S.
- Education: Cranbrook Academy of Art
- Known for: 3D quilt-making
- Website: carolyncrump.com

Carolyn Crump (born 1960) is an American quilting artist whose work focuses on African American culture. Her work is included in the collections of the Smithsonian American Art Museum and the Michigan State University African American Quilt Collection.

== Early life and education ==
Crump was born and raised in Detroit, Michigan and works in Houston, Texas. She studied advertising design at the Cranbrook Academy of Art.

== Career ==
She is a member of the Women of Color Quilters Network. In 2009, her quilt From Vision to Victory, celebrating the inauguration of Barack Obama, was exhibited at the Historical Society of Washington, D.C. Her 2020 quilt Cracked Justice uses a multi-media approach to illustrate the George Floyd protests in Minneapolis. During the COVID-19 pandemic, she began designing quilted face masks with activist themes.

Crump states that she was inspired to pursue quilt-making because it was passed down through her family. She cites Michelangelo and the old masters as her artistic influences.

In addition to quilt-making, Crump works in several other media including etching, handmade paper, acrylic paint, clay and wood.

=== Exhibitions ===
In 2017, her work was included in the Dynamic Diversity exhibition at the Texas Quilt Museum. In 2019, she had work featured in the Fiber Art in the Digital Age show at the Wisconsin Museum of Quilts and Fiber Arts. In 2020, Crump's quilt Cracked Justice was exhibited at the Textile Center in Minneapolis.

=== Collections ===
Her work is included in the Michigan State University African American Quilt Collection. Four of her masks, BLM-4, George Floyd, Mermaid, and Schoolgirl, were acquired by the Smithsonian American Art Museum as part of the Renwick Gallery's 50th Anniversary Campaign.
