= Museo de Mujeres Artistas Mexicanas =

The Museo de Mujeres Artistas Mexicanas or MUMA (The Museum of Mexican Women Artists) is a virtual museum exhibiting the work of Mexican women artists, founded by the photographer Lucero González in 2008 to show the work of Mexican women in distinct fields of the arts. The museum's advisory board both curates the works exhibited and conducts research related to the artists and their work.

The first exhibition of the museum featured the work of 50 artists including Leonora Carrington, Lola Álvarez Bravo, Laura Anderson, Mariana Yampolvsky and Graciela Iturbide, and feminist artists like Helen Escobedo, Marta Lick, Silvia Navarrete and Lucero González, among others. It was produced with support from the Mexican Society for Women's Rights, AC, Semillas (Seeds), and is a non-profit project.

In 2015 the museum had exhibited the work of 270 women Mexican artists.

== Advisory board ==
The museum's multidisciplinary advisory board members are:

Angélica Abelleyra	Journalist
Grace Quintanilla †	Video artist
Helen Escobedo †	Visual artist
Karen Lamb	Art historian
Lorena Wolffer	Performance
Lucero González	Photographer and video artist
Magali Lara	Painter
Marta Palau Bosch	Visual artist
Mónica Mayer	Performance
Pilar García	Art historian and curator
