= Sherri Smith (artist) =

American fiber artist, educator (born 1943)

- Born: March 21, 1943 (age 83); Evanston, Illinois, United States
- Education: Stanford University (BA), Cranbrook Academy of Art (MFA)
- Occupations: Fiber and textile artist, weaver, sculptor, educator
- Known for: Large-scale and three-dimensional hanging sculptures, waffle weave sculptures
- Movement: American studio craft
- Website: www.sherrismithfiber.net

Sherri Smith (born 1943) is an American fiber and textile artist, weaver, sculptor, and educator. She is one of the pioneers within the field of fiber art since the late 1960s. Smith taught for many years at the University of Michigan (UMich) in Ann Arbor, where she is the Catherine B. Heller Collegiate Professor Emerita. In 2012, she was named a fellow of the American Craft Council (ACC).

== Early life and education ==
Smith was born on March 21, 1943, in Evanston, Illinois, U.S.. However some sources state she was born in Chicago.

She graduated with a BA degree in 1965 and Phi Beta Kappa from Stanford University; and went on to earn an MFA degree in 1967, in weaving and textile design from Cranbrook Academy of Art.

== Career ==
Smith opened her career as a textile designer with two New York City firms, Dorothy Liebes, Inc., (1968), and Boris Kroll Fabrics (1969). In 1969, Smith achieved early acclaim after participating in the pivotal group art exhibition, Wall Hangings (1969) at the Museum of Modern Art.

She began her academic career teaching at Colorado State University in Fort Collins, from 1971 to 1974. From 1974 until 2018, she taught at the University of Michigan, Ann Arbor.

Her artwork is included in public museum collections, including at the Fine Arts Museums of San Francisco; the Smithsonian American Art Museum, the Art Institute of Chicago; the Minneapolis Institute of Art; and the Rhode Island School of Design Museum.
