= Monica Rudquist =

American ceramics artist

- Intersection
- Born: 1961 (age 64–65); Minneapolis, Minnesota
- Known for: Ceramics
- Website: monicarudquist.com

Monica E. Rudquist is a ceramic artist working out of Minneapolis, Minnesota. She is known for her distinctive "spiraling shapes" and works primarily in porcelain. In addition, her work features wheel-thrown functional wares as well as large-scale, abstract wall installations.

== Early life and education ==
Monica Rudquist was born in 1961 in Minneapolis, Minnesota. Rudquist's father, Jerry Rudquist, was an artist and art professor at Macalester College. Her mother, Raquel Rudquist (née Ruiz Zorrilla), was an architect for Target Corporation and one of the first female architects in Minnesota. She had recognizable clay talent from a young age and worked with Gail Kristenson when she was only twelve. When studying at Macalester, Ron Gallas had a large influence on Rudquist's work in series. Rudquist has said that her father is her biggest artistic inspiration because of his prowess with color and bravery when it came to risk-taking. Rudquist received her bachelor's degree from Macalester College in St. Paul, Minnesota in 1983, graduating magna cum laude in both Arts and French. In 1985, she received her Master of Fine Arts, Ceramics, from Cranbrook Academy of Art in Bloomfield Hills, Michigan. While in Michigan, Monica studied with Jun Kaneko. Ceramic artist Kaneko helped Rudquist see that, "the juxtaposition of pieces within a space and in relation to each other is as important as the spaces created within the pieces themselves.

== Artwork ==
Rudquist creates wheel-thrown functional pieces. Her pieces have fluid shapes and "explores the space between function and sculpture". Rudquist frequently works in multiples and finds artistic value in examining the spaces between pieces. Rudquist often cuts into the walls of her wheel-thrown vessels disrupting the sense of volume. According to Matt Beachey, “when Rudquist envisions a piece, she starts with a simple, practical object, like a teapot, and makes it into something unique and awe-inspiring.” She creates sculptural arrangements by joining cut vessels, re-assembling the parts with overlapping and uneven edges. She pinches in and pulls out her cups and bowls to create more expressive shapes. Rudquist is equally concerned about the space within the vessel as well as the surrounding space. “Her creations carry her signature monochromatic appearance, looking simultaneously fluid and firm.”

== InContext ==
Rudquist was a recipient of the 2013 Artist Initiative Grant provided by the Minnesota State Arts Board. Through this grant, she created and exhibited her work in her exhibition titled InContext. In November 2013-January 2014, this exhibition took place in the Emily Galusha Gallery at Northern Clay Center in Minneapolis, Minnesota. The centerpiece of the show, "Intersection" measured 6.5 ft x 25 ft. This work "explored the interplay and patterns between the interior and exterior of form and the spaces created between the forms when they are set side-by-side." This show included wall, pedestal, and floor installations and all works had multiple pieces. Intersection is made up of approximately one thousand smaller pieces, each with a small hole in the back for easy hanging. "Intersections" is now permanently installed at the headquarters of LifeSource, a non-profit organization that facilitates organ and tissue transplants, in Minneapolis, Minnesota. A LifeSource representative writes, “Each piece in this artwork stands on its own as a familiar and intimate vessel and yet is part of something bigger as the shapes are joined in unexpected ways. A space remains between the individual pieces, giving honor to the space between as much as the space contained within.”

== Professional life ==
Rudquist has worked at the Bloomington Art Center in Bloomington, Minnesota, Edina Art Center in Edina, Minnesota, and St. Olaf College in Northfield, Minnesota. She has worked at St. Catherine University since 2008 as a ceramics professor. She spent three years working with 700 K-8 students at the Seward Montessori School helping them to create a "Time Line of Life" tile mural, a project that was organized through Northern Clay Center.

She holds exhibitions three to four times a year at various art fairs and galleries. She is also a founding member of Northern Clay Center and was a member of Women's Art Resources of Minnesota in the 1990s. She is currently a member of Minnesota Women Ceramic Artists. She is a longtime member of National Council of Ceramic Artists.

She also leads the Clay Club at St. Catherine University which support the non- profit organization "Open arms" whose mission is to bring food to people who cannot take care of themselves easily and people with illnesses. They do this through the Empty Bowls social, in which students on a selected date make bowls, which later get used at the event where people can give a donation and receive a hand made bowl with soup.

== Honors and awards ==
- 2018 – Carol Easley Denny Award, St. Catherine University
- 2013 – Minnesota State Arts Board Initiative Grant
- 2012 – Best of Show (ceramics) Lakefront Arts Festival, Milwaukee, Wisconsin
- 2008 – Newcomer Award, 57th Street Art Fair, Chicago, Illinois
- 2002 – Best of Show (ceramics) Minnesota Crafts Festival, St. Paul, Minnesota
- 2001 – Awarded a State Resolution by the State of Minnesota "in recognition of her artistic contributions to the state of Minnesota"
- 2000 – Invitational Awards, Madison Art on the Square, Madison, Wisconsin

== Selected exhibitions ==
- 2015 – Constructed Visions: Two Views, The Catherine G. Murphy Gallery, St Catherine University, St. Paul, Minnesota.
- 2015 – ART- INSPIRED MUSIC PROJECT 2ND EDITION, McNally Smith College of Music, St. Paul, Minnesota
- 2015 – Eat Drink and ...Minnesota Women Ceramic Artists Exhibition, Northern Clay Center, Minneapolis, Minnesota
- 2014 – OBJECTS: MMAA, Minnesota Museum of American Art, St Paul, Minnesota
- 2014 -Red River Reciprocity, Plains Art Museum, Fargo, North Dakota
- 2014 – Super Surprise, group exhibition of Minnesota Women Ceramic Artists, Milwaukee, Wisconsin
- 2013 – INCONTEXT, solo exhibition, Emily Galusha Gallery, Northern Clay Center, Minneapolis, Minnesota
- 2013 – Ceramics3, Metal 2- 5 ARTISTS, The Catherine G. Murphy Gallery, St. Catherine University, St. Paul, Minnesota
- 2013 – Priscilla Mouritzen, Monica Rudquist & Hide Sadohara, Santa Fe Clay, Santa Fe, New Mexico
- 2013 – The House We Built: Feminist Art Then and Now, Katherine Nash Gallery, Regis Center for Arts, University of Minnesota, Minneapolis, Minnesota
- 2011 – Teapot Invitational, Grand Hand Gallery, St Paul Minnesota
- 2011 – Founding Member's 20 Year Celebration, Northern Clay Center Minneapolis Minnesota
- 2010 – Ceramics Then and Now, Harry M. Drake Gallery, St. Paul Academy, St. Paul, Minnesota
- 2009 – Monica Rudquist, Collaboration and Variation Harry M. Drake Gallery, St. Paul, Minnesota
- 2008 – Minnesota Women Ceramics Northfield Arts Guild. Northfield, Minnesota
- 2007 – Ladies in White, Goodall Gallery, Louisville, Kentucky
- 2006 – 30/30, Lill Street Gallery, Chicago, Illinois
- 2004 – A National Invitational of Functional Clay Art, Baltimore Clayworks, Baltimore, Maryland
- 2003 – Hundreds of Cups, an invitational, Santa Fe Clay, Santa Fe, New Mexico
- 2002 – Clay City, Fahrenheit Gallery, Kansas City, Missouri
- 2001 – Strictly Functional, The Artworks Gallery, Ephrata, Pennsylvania
- 2000 – New Work; Monica Rudquist and Michael Bailey, Lower town Gallery, St. Paul, Minnesota
- 1999 – Monica Rudquist- Teapot, The Phipps Center for the Arts, Hudson, Wisconsin
- 1997 – Minnesota/Wisconsin Invitational Lill Street Gallery, Chicago, Illinois
- 1996 – Women in Clay, Rochester Art Center, Rochester, Minnesota
- 1995 – Regional Ceramic Artists, Edina Art Center, Edina, Minnesota
- 1992 – Cup Show, Laura Russo Gallery, San Diego, California
- 1991 – New Clay Works – Monica Rudquist, Anderson & Anderson Gallery, Minneapolis, Minnesota
- 1990 – WARM A.I.R., A.I.R. Gallery, New York City, New York
- 1989 – WARM at the Lawton Gallery University of Wisconsin, Green Bay, Wisconsin
- 1988 – It's going to be a W.A.R.M. Summer, Katherine Nash Gallery, U of M, Minneapolis, Minnesota.
- 1987 – Women Working in Porcelain, College of St. Benedict, St. Joseph, Minnesota
- 1986 – Ceramic Constructions- Monica Rudquist, Anderson & Anderson Gallery, Minneapolis, Minnesota
