= Mildred Constantine =

American curator

- Constantine in 1972
- Born: June 28, 1913; Brooklyn, New York
- Died: December 10, 2008 (aged 95); Nyack, New York

Mildred Constantine Bettelheim (June 28, 1913 – December 10, 2008) was an American curator who helped bring attention to the posters and other graphic design in the collection of the Museum of Modern Art in the 1950s and 1960s

== Biography ==
Constantine (she used her maiden name professionally) was born on June 28, 1913 in Brooklyn, New York. She received bachelor's and master's degrees from New York University and attended the graduate school of the National Autonomous University of Mexico.

She worked for the College Art Association from 1931 to 1937 as an editorial assistant on the journal Parnassus. She met Rene d'Harnoncourt, her future boss as director of the Museum of Modern Art, while she was working in Washington, D.C., at the Office of the Coordinator of Inter-American Affairs. She also traveled to Mexico, in 1936, as part of the leftist Committee Against War and Fascism, where she developed an interest in Latin and Central American political graphics. A Latin American poster collection she organized was shown at the Library of Congress and later became part of the Metropolitan Museum of Art's permanent collection.

While in Washington, she met Ralph Bettelheim, a refugee from Austria and an economist. They were married in 1942.

From 1943 through 1970, Constantine worked in the architecture and design department of the Museum of Modern Art, as associate curator and later as curatorial consultant, where she helped popularize collections that were hard to categorize or had been ignored, which she called "fugitive material". Her 1948 exhibition Polio Posters was the museum's first devoted to causes, and included works she commissioned to help spread awareness of various social issues.

She organized solo exhibitions for graphic and product designers including Alvin Lustig, Bruno Munari, Massimo Vignelli and Tadanori Yokoo that were described by The New York Times as "career-defining". Her broader-themed exhibitions in the applied and decorative arts included Olivetti: Design in Industry in 1952, Signs in the Street in 1954, and the 1962 exhibit of Lettering by Hand.

Constantine organized the 1968 exhibition titled Word and Image, which was the first exhibition to focus on the posters in the museum's collection from the 20th century, and whose catalog is considered a major element documenting the history of the poster. In his January 1968 review of the exhibit, art critic John Canaday of The New York Times wrote:

"the Museum of Modern Art's new exhibition of posters, which opened yesterday under the title Word and Image, is so handsome that for a minute you wonder why billboards are disfigurements," noting that the museum had held 35 prior poster exhibitions but that this was its most comprehensive and that while most posters look dated after a few years, the items Constantine selected from the museum's collection of 2,000 posters "are as forceful as when they were issued."

Critic Hilton Kramer's review in The Times, described the exhibit as consisting of 300 posters from the period from 1879 to 1967, chosen by Constantine based on their "esthetic merit", though Kramer felt that the exhibit could not explain the late-1960s poster fad whose psychedelic designs he believed were no match for the graphic masterpieces of earlier days.

Constantine died at age 95 on December 10, 2008, of heart failure in her home in Nyack, New York.

=== Textiles ===
Constantine also curated and wrote about textiles. Along with Jack Lenor Larsen, Constantine curated wall hangings that toured 11 cities from 1968 to 1969 and wrote Beyond Craft: The Art Fabric in 1973.

In 1972, Mildred Constantine reproduced Alice Adams's 1966 Construction in her book Beyond Craft. She wrote the book in conjunction with Jack Lenor Larsen which was the first in-depth look of the emergent fiber art movement. This text spoke about how fiber art evolved, defined its aesthetic intentions, and defended work made of fiber as "fine art".

Following her 1971 departure from the Museum of Modern Art, she produced exhibitions and books on the subjects of caricature, cartoons, decorative arts and photography, and also curated the 1988 Frontiers in Fiber: The Americans, and the 2002 exhibit Small Works in Fiber, both of which drew attention to textile and fiber art

=== Author ===
Constantine wrote or co-wrote many books on fiber arts and other subjects:.

- 1960 Art Nouveau: Art and Design at the Turn of the Century, editor (with Peter Selz)
- 1969 Word And Image: Posters from the Collection of the Museum of Modern Art (with Alan M. Fern)
- 1973 Beyond Craft: The Art of Fabric (with Jack Lenor Larsen)
- 1974 Revolutionary Soviet Film Posters
- 1981 Art Fabric: Mainstream
- 1983 Tina Modotti: A Fragile Life
- 1986 The Art Fabric: Mainstream
- 1997 Whole Cloth
- 1999 25 for the 25th: Glancing Back, Gazing Ahead (with Lloyd Cotsen, Jack Lenor Larsen and Patricia Mal)
- 2000 Theo Leffmann (with Mary Jane Jacob, Theo Leffmann and David Mickenberg)
- 2004 Jack Lenor Larsen: Creator and Collector (with David Revere McFadden)

== See also ==
- Women in the art history field
