= Mary Walker Phillips =

American textile artist (1923–2007)

- Born: November 23, 1923; Fresno, California, U.S.
- Died: November 3, 2007 (aged 83); Fresno, California, U.S.
- Education: Cranbrook Academy of Art
- Occupations: Textile artist, knitter, author, educator
- Known for: Revolutionizing knitting in the 1960s

Mary Walker Phillips (November 23, 1923 – November 3, 2007), was an American textile artist, author and educator. She revolutionized the craft of hand knitting by exploring knitting as an independent art form. Her hand-knit tapestries and other creative pieces are exhibited in museums in the U.S. and Europe. She was honored as a fellow by the American Craft Council (ACC) in 1978.

Phillips is regarded as one of the most important knitters of the 20th century, as well as an important personality in the fiber arts movement and the advancement of the American studio craft. In the catalog to her 1984 Fresno Arts Center exhibition, Jack Lenor Larsen described Phillips as the "transition between the old-fashioned, pattern-book knitting and the extraordinary things going on in England and America today."

== Biography ==
Phillips was born in Fresno, California, on November 23, 1923, and began knitting in childhood as a traditional knitter. She attended the Cranbrook Academy of Art in Bloomfield Hills, Michigan from 1946 to 1947, when she received her BFA degree, studying contemporary weaving and textiles.

She moved to San Francisco and worked in the studio of Dorothy Liebes as a weaver before setting up her own studio. Her talent was recognized by the wife of architect Frank Lloyd Wright, who commissioned her to create interior textiles for Taliesin West, the Wrights' home in Scottsdale, Arizona. Later, she traveled to Europe before returning to Fresno where she worked as a freelancer and teacher.

In 1960, she returned to the Cranbrook Academy of Art to continue her studies in experimental textiles. She earned her MFA in 1963. She then moved to Greenwich Village, New York City.

== Work ==
Inspired by a friend, textile designer Jack Lenor Larson, she added knitting to her artistic practice. The Fresno Art Museum showed 100 of her works in 1964. The works included woven upholstery, tie-dyed blankets, wall hangings, rugs, knitted sculptures and ceramics. She is well known for her architecturally inspired knitted wall hangings that were very abstract and is regarded as a pioneer in the use of experimental materials. These knitted art pieces incorporated unusual natural and synthetic materials such as linen, silk, paper, tape, leather, hair, asbestos fibers, seeds, fiberglass and metals. Unlike past knitting forms, she strayed away from the usual patterns and instead created works that resembled tapestries and lace. As a fellow of the American Craft Council, she is noted as being the first to acknowledge knitting as a form of artistic expression.

Phillips created woven textile works for architectural spaces, but soon her work transitioned from weaving into knitted works and macramé. This shift in her artistic practice was an important part of the transition of the 20th century fiber arts movement, that implicated the movement from utility to art.

She was also a teacher at The New School for Social Research.

== Books ==
Her books about hand knitting for the mass market and her workshops helped revolutionize the mass production industry, shifting it from woven fabrics to knits. Previously, knitting had been limited to the creation of practical items, such as sweaters. Her works and influence helped create the hand-crafted, 'DIY' revolution.

Jack Lenor Larsen (a textile designer) wrote in the foreword to Phillips' book, Step by Step Knitting, “[S]he is the great knitter of our time. She has taken knitting out of the socks-and-sweater doldrums to prove that knit fabric can be a blanket, a pillow, a piece of art ... she demonstrates that knitting is a creative medium of self-expression.”

Her works are in the permanent collections of the Smithsonian Institution in Washington D.C., the Art Institute of Chicago, the Museum of Modern Art in New York, the Royal Scottish Museum in Edinburgh, Scotland, and the Cooper-Hewitt National Museum of Design (Smithsonian) New York. She wrote five books on knitting and macramé.

In 1984, she was awarded a fellowship grant from the National Endowment for the Arts for her last book, Knitting Counterpanes: Traditional Coverlet Patterns for Contemporary Knitters.

== Death ==
Phillips died from complications of Alzheimer's disease on November 3, 2007, at age 83.

== Bibliography ==
- Step by Step Knitting (1967)
- Step by Step Macramé (1970)
- Creative Knitting, A New Art Form (1971, 1986)
- The Encyclopedia of Crafts (1980)
- Knitting Counterpanes, Traditional Coverlet Patterns for Contemporary Knitters (1989)

== Works about Phillips ==
Her nephew John Phillips wrote a book about her family, The Good Intent: The Story and Heritage of a Fresno Family (New York: Magnolia Group Press, 2007).
