= Ken Isaacs =

American designer

Ken Isaacs (7 February 1927 – 8 June 2016), born in Peoria, Illinois, was an American designer. He is known for his creation of a matrix-based modular system to build living structures.

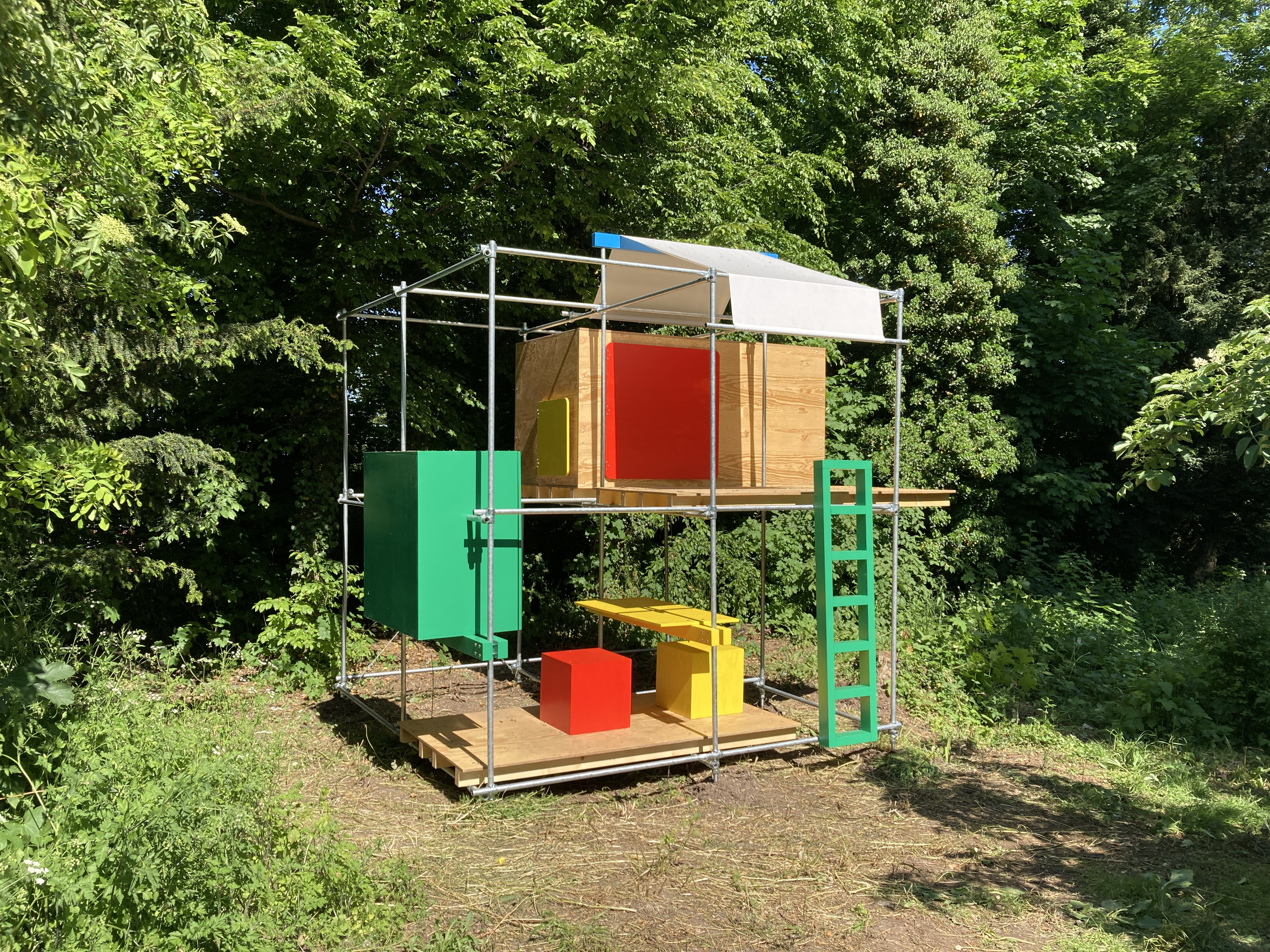
Ken Isaacs' Fun House, as rebuilt for Open House Geneva in 2022

Isaacs described in 1974 how to build modular houses in a book called How to Build Your Own Living Structures. He was head of the Design Department at the Cranbrook Academy of Arts from 1956 to 1958. He maintained a design office and apartment in New York City between 1956 and 1972, often commuting from Bloomfield Hills, Michigan.

In 2019, a retrospective biography of Isaacs was written by Susan Snodgrass, who worked with him to exhibit his work during his lifetime. The book, Inside the Matrix: The Radical Designs of Ken Isaacs, was partially funded by the Graham Foundation for Advanced Studies in the Fine Arts.
