= Olga de Amaral =

Colombian textile and visual artist (born 1932)

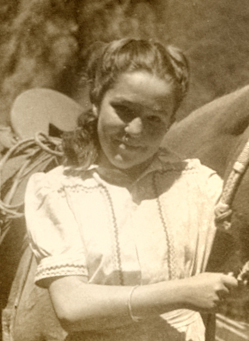
- Born: Olga Ceballos Vélez; 1932 (age 93–94); Bogotá, Colombia
- Education: Cranbrook Academy of Arts (1954-55)
- Known for: tapestry, textile art, color, gesso, gold
- Style: abstract art
- Spouse: Jim Amaral
- Website: http://olgadeamaral.art

Olga de Amaral (born 1932) is a Colombian textile and visual artist known for her large-scale abstract works made with fibers and covered in gold and/or silver leaf. She was one of the few artists from South America internationally known for her work in fiber art during the 1960s and 1970s. She lives and works in Bogotá, Colombia.

== Biography and education ==
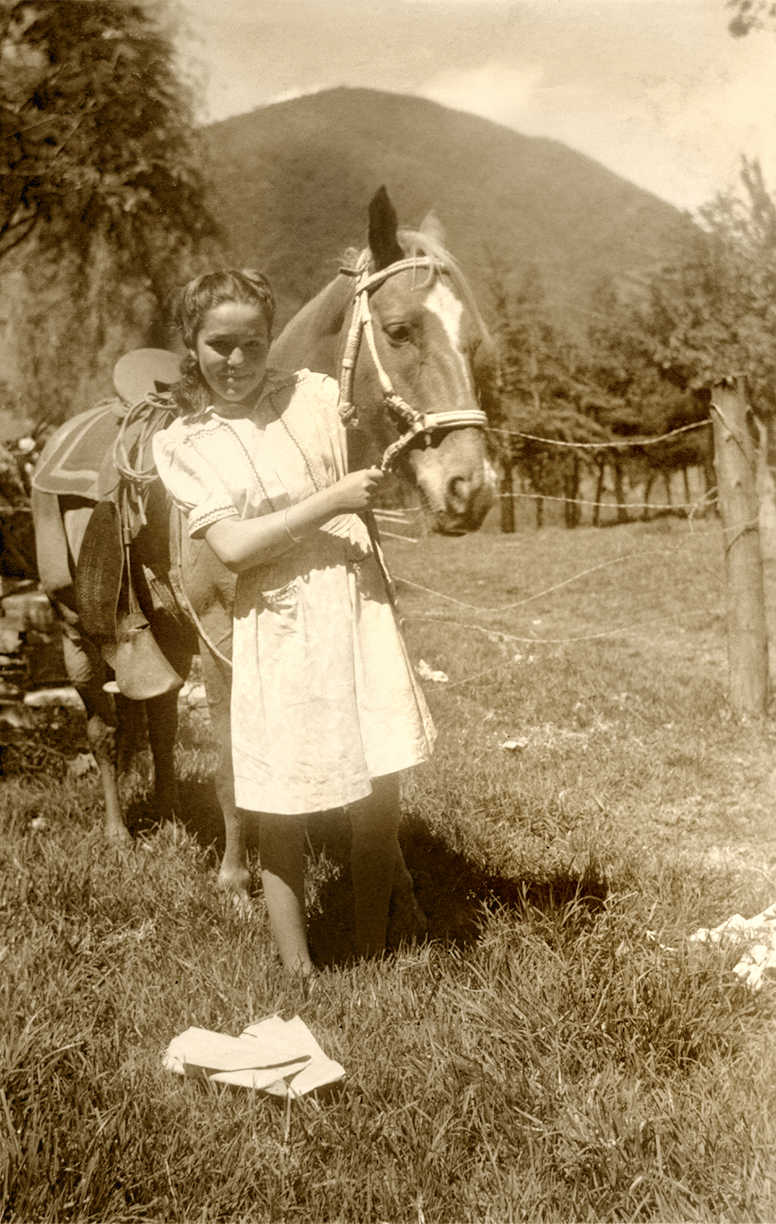
de Amaral in Ubaté, Colombia, 1944.

Olga de Amaral was born Olga Ceballos Velez in 1932 in Bogotá, Cundinamarca, Colombia, to parents from Colombia's Antioquia region. She had five sisters and two brothers. Upon graduating from high school, in the years 1951–52 she got a degree in Architectural Design at the Colegio Mayor de Cundinamarca in Bogotá.

In 1954 de Amaral went to New York City to study English at Columbia University. From 1954 to 1955, she studied fiber art at the Cranbrook Academy of Art in Bloomfield Hills, Michigan. At Cranbrook she met Jim Amaral and they became close friends.

In 1955, after a year in Cranbrook, she returned to Colombia and started to make decorative textiles on commission for architects. Meanwhile, Amaral served in the U.S. Navy on a base in the Philippines. In 1956 Amaral visited Colombia to see Olga, initially for a few weeks. They married in 1957 and settled in Bogotá. They had two children and started a workshop for handwoven textiles. During that period, Jack Lenor Larsen visited Colombia and the Amaral's workshop. He expressed interest in Olga's tapestries. In 1965 de Amaral founded and taught at the Textile Department at the University of Los Andes (Colombia) in Bogotá.

In 1966-1967 the Amaral family lived in New York. There she met Eileen Vanderbilt from the World Crafts Council and became the Council's Colombian representative.

== Art ==
From the beginning, Olga de Amaral's art has been driven by the creation of works that redefine notions of unity, concept, representation, and personal expression. de Amaral explores and revisits ideas, techniques, and processes, looking for subtle and intricate variations within her own artistic process. Her work takes the elements of painting off the stretcher and into space, approaching the problem of the superposition, of layering in a painting form the point of view of the material itself – the painting's support, the canvas, the fabric or texture.

At first categorised as two dimensional, representational wall hangings, in the late 1960s her works entered the genres of sculpture, installation, abstract and conceptual art:

"De Amaral's art deftly bridges myriad craft traditions; it's concerned with process and materiality, with the principles of formalism, abstraction and metaphysicality. The artist has developed a distinct voice in her field through her command of conventional techniques for constructing textile objects while progressively pushing the boundaries of orthodox understanding of how textiles work as objects in space. She has gradually moved fabric-based works beyond the category of woven tapestry - one that privileges flatness, adherence to the wall, pictorials, and an obsession with the organic and the physical properties of materials - into a more conceptual practice that embraces strategies otherwise found in painting, sculpture, and architecture."

The way the artist incorporates the materials, natural and man-made fibres, paint, gesso, and precious metals (gold and silver leaf mostly), through the handcraft, artisanal process and techniques, reference Colombia's pre-Hispanic art, indigenous weaving traditions, and the Spanish Colonial Baroque legacy, brought to the New World by the Catholic colonists. As Twylene Moyer indicated, this inspiration is "a true mestizaje, or mixing of cultures." What those cultures had in common, was that they all attributed great expressive power to the visual, just as de Amaral's work embody visual and tactile content "reconnecting us to an ancient understanding and appreciation of images as presences unto themselves, capable of transcending materiality to express truth through beauty". This ability to connect the ancient and the contemporary has allowed the artist to create works on the premise that "art has the power to transcend representation and embody spiritual and emotional values through form. (...) Her tapestries are nothing less than meditations on the illusive nature of meaning."

Thread, color and light determine the visual and metaphorical aspect of de Amaral's works. "I began to work with fiber by coincidence - a sought coincidence - and have continued with it because it has never disappointed me. As I get to know it better, the better it knows me. In briefer words, it has never stopped arousing my curiosity. Fiber is like an old pencil: one has used it for so long that you take it for granted. I am made of fiber because I have embraced it and because I know it". Olga de Amaral on color: "When I think about color, when I touch color, when I live color - the intimate exaltation of my being, my other self - I fly, I feel as another, there is always another being next to me."

de Amaral's art is most often interpreted through the themes of architecture, mathematics, and socio-cultural dichotomies in Colombia, but mostly landscape: "Fascinated by the shapes of rocks, streams, hills, mountains, and clouds, she finds inspiration in the broken textures and movements of the landscapes surrounding her home in Bogotá. From the geometric designs of medieval cosmological diagrams to the grids of Mondrian, harmonious symmetry of form has alluded to and partaken of perfection and the absolute." Her oeuvre is characterized by various series, each with a particular essence or technique that encompass a plethora of intricate variations developed throughout her career. The titles of de Amaral's numerous series reveal the themes behind her weavings: Alchemies, Moonbaskets, Lost Images, Ceremonial Cloths, Writings, Forests, Rivers, Mountains, Moons, Square Suns, Umbras, Stelae, etc. As Amparo Osorio pointed out, "much of poetry (...) emerges from these images in movement, whose titling (…) is another referent for us to achieve an understanding of this recondite sense, of that desire to say in the language of symbols all that is beyond words."

Her work was included in the 2024 exhibition Making Their Mark: Works from the Shah Garg Collection at the Berkeley Art Museum and Pacific Film Archive (BAMPFA).

== Early work from the 1960s ==
In 1969 de Amaral took part in a collective exhibition of 27 fiber artists at MoMA New York entitled "Wall Hangings". It was an international exhibition curated by an architecture and design curator Mildred Constantine organised with Jack Lenor Larsen and presented in the art section of MoMA, that up until then was reserved only for painting or sculpture.

In the late 60's, with the creation of the piece Entrelazado en naranja, gris, multicolor (1969), de Amaral eventually "exploded the picture plane from inside out". At the end of this period, the artist left the fundamental concept of fabric weaving (the opposition between warp and weft), by leaving only the warp (in the form of braiding) and letting it float freely. The full form or volume stressed in the composition of the pieces from this period, make them look almost like thread sculptures. However, after this period of pushing the art of weaving to its boundaries, in the next decade, the issue of the flat surface will emerge again in de Amaral's art. Olga's massive hangings called Muros tejidos (Woven Walls), solid bulwarks built from stiff wool and horsehair, debuted at a solo exhibit at the Museum of Contemporary Crafts in New York in 1970. In 1971 Olga took part in an exhibition "Deliberate Entanglements" at the University of California, Los Angeles organised by its art professor Bernard Kester. It showed American and Eastern European fiber art for the first time in Southern California. It reflected the era's revolutionary fiber sculpture, particularly its tendency towards monumentality.

== The shift from crafts to fine art in the 1970s ==
In the 1970s Olga de Amaral started the following series: Muros, Corazas, Hojarascas, Marañas, Estructuras, Fragmentos completos, the Calicanto series, Farallones and Eslabones. "From the beginning of her career in the 1960s, certainly from the Muros and Hojarascas of the 1970s, Amaral had made it clear that the debate over whether weaving was art or craft would be, in her case at least, moot. From the onset, there has been a distinct sense in her work that it could, and did, embody important ideas and reflections of an existential and historical character".

=== The Muros ===
The Walls was the first series where the artist started to take more risks that led her to break with predictable geometric patterns and replace them by rhythms that for the first time engaged the eye into the work. The inclusion of the viewer in the experience, together with the growing dimensions of de Amaral's works, marked a threshold in the artist's career and put her on the international fine arts map: "(…) in the late 1960s through the mid-70s (…) fiber artists became more attentive to the shape and dimensions of the architectural context and the phenomenological experience of the viewer.(…) So when a work like Olga de Amaral's six-story El Gran Muro was installed in 1976 in the lobby of the Westin Peachtree Plaza in Atlanta, the wall functioned less as a backdrop or frame than a determinant of the wool-and-horsehair tapestry's monumental, vertical form".

=== The Fragmentos Completos ===
During her stay in Paris in the early 1970s, living in small spaces, Olga created a series of small pieces entitled Complete Fragments (1975). In this series the artist used gold for the first time, playing and experimenting with it. She also started to paint fibres with acrylic paint and gesso to obtain colors directly on the finished woven piece in order to dissolve the geometry imposed by the rigid structure of warp and weft. These poetic sketches were shown at the Rivolta Gallery in Lausanne, Switzerland. This technical innovation gave the artist much more freedom with the final surfaces of the works than the color-dyed fibres. It also moved her tapestries from the "crafts" to the "fine-arts" category. "Color is language common to all cultures. Color helps me to distance myself from the surface to add different meanings to the tapestry. The Fragments begin a period of mostly monochromatic works culminating with the Calicanto series.

== Collections ==
de Amaral's work is in the collection of the Art Institute of Chicago, the Cleveland Museum of Art, the Metropolitan Museum of Art, the Museum of Modern Art, the Smithsonian American Art Museum, and the Tate.

de Amaral's work, Montaña #13, was acquired by the Smithsonian American Art Museum as part of the Renwick Gallery's 50th Anniversary Campaign.

=== Awards and recognitions ===
- 1973 Guggenheim Fellowship, New York, USA.
- 2010 Member of the Academia Nacional de Bellas Artes in Buenos Aires, Argentina.
- 2011 Honoree of the Multicultural Benefit Gala at the Metropolitan Museum of Art, New York, USA.
