= Jack Lenor Larsen =

American textile designer (1927–2020)

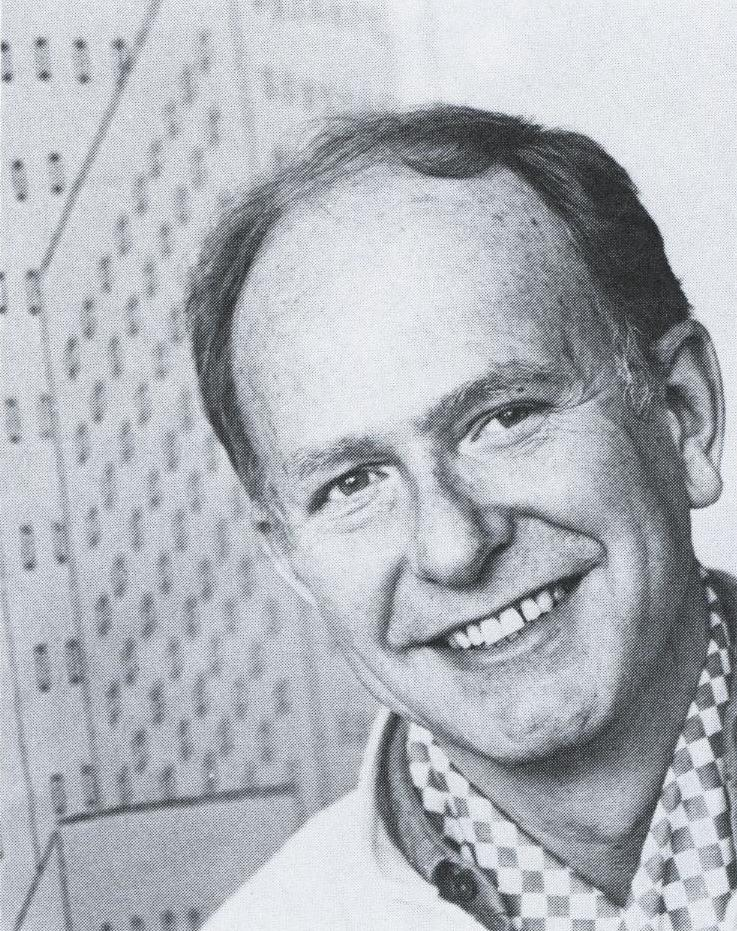
- Larsen circa 1978
- Born: August 5, 1927; Seattle, Washington, U.S.
- Died: December 22, 2020 (aged 93); East Hampton, New York, U.S.
- Education: University of Washington; Cranbrook Academy of Art
- Known for: Textile design
- Notable work: Jack Lenor Larsen, Inc.; LongHouse Reserve (1992)

Jack Lenor Larsen (August 5, 1927 – December 22, 2020) was an American textile designer, author, collector and promoter of traditional and contemporary craftsmanship. He was noted for bringing fabric patterns and textiles to go with modernist architecture and furnishings. Some of his works are part of permanent collections at museums, including the Museum of Modern Art, the Victoria and Albert Museum, the Art Institute of Chicago, the Musée des Arts Décoratifs at the Louvre, and the Minneapolis Institute of Art, which has his most significant archive.

== Early life ==
Larsen was born on August 5, 1927, in Seattle, Washington, to Mabel (née Bye) and Elmer Larsen. His father was a building contractor. His parents were Canadians of Danish-Norwegian ancestry who moved to Bremerton, Washington, from Alberta, Canada. He was educated in Bremerton before enrolling at the School of Architecture at the University of Washington, where he struggled with drawing, and became interested in interior design, weaving, and furniture design. The following year he moved to Los Angeles to focus on fabrics; he worked as a weaver's apprentice and also taught actress Joan Crawford to weave. In 1949 he studied ancient Peruvian textiles in Seattle and opened a studio in the city. In 1951, he earned his Master of Fine Arts degree from the Cranbrook Academy of Art, Michigan, and moved to New York, where he opened a studio.

== Career ==
In a career starting in the 1950s, Larsen designed thousands of fabric patterns and textiles, many associated with the modernist architecture and furnishings popular with post-1945 American consumers. One of his first commissions in 1951, was to design the curtains for the Manhattan glass skyscraper Lever House for which he designed a translucent linen and gold metal themed weave to go with the building's plain glass walls. In 1952, he founded his own firm, Jack Lenor Larsen, Inc. In 1951 the interior designer Florence Knoll turned down his textile designs as too "individualistic", but by 1953, she was commissioning olive-green- and orange-coloured Larsen textiles for furnishings. From the beginning, Larsen's distinctive hand-woven furnishing fabrics with random repeats in variegated, natural yarns were popular with clients such as Marilyn Monroe. In 1958, he designed his first aeroplane upholstery, for Pan American Airlines. His interest in international weaving and textile crafts made him familiar with techniques such as ikat and batik, which he introduced to the American public, and by 1974, Larsen's company was manufacturing fabrics in 30 countries. In the late 1950s, Larsen launched a fashion label, 'JL Arbiter', which although successful, was short lived. Larsen Incorporated merged with Cowtan & Tout, the American subsidiary of the London-based fabric company Colefax and Fowler, in July 1997.

In the 1960s, Larsen briefly ventured in designing garments including designing ties for American sculptor Alexander Calder, American composer Leonard Bernstein, and Chinese-American architect I. M. Pei. During this period, it is noted that American singer Joan Baez requested him to create custom clothing for her, which he turned down. In 1968, Larsen designed the interiors and fabrics of Braniff International Airways innovative Terminal of the Future at the Dallas, Texas, carrier's Dallas Love Field hub. He also designed the textiles for use in the interior of Braniff's new Boeing 747 in 1970. Some of his collaborators in the 1960s included American glass sculptor Dale Chihuly, whom he convinced to give up weaving glass and try blowing instead, and Estonian-American architect Louis Kahn with whom he designed hangings from First Unitarian Church of Rochester in New York.

His works are noted to have been inspired by his early life in the Pacific Northwest, with a focus on "moody, misty landscapes, and Asian cultural influences". He also brought in international influences into his work. He brought Indonesian dyeing techniques of Ikat and Batik to American audiences. His design of upholstery material Magnum in 1970, brought in Indian influences including the use of small mirrors. He would also go on to replicating the same design with a film of mylar along with his associate Win Anderson. He was also noted to have designed drapery that reduced the glare of modern glass buildings with a focus on retaining the architectural style and not disintegrating in heat and light. He also pioneered the use of stretch nylon that could be stretched over furniture, screen printing on velvet, and produced two sided textures and patterns on bath towels.

Larsen's works are preserved in the collections of major museums around the world, and he is one of only two design houses to have been the subject of an exhibition at the Palais du Louvre, when it hosted a one-man retrospective of his works in 1981. In 1969, Larsen co-curated Wall Hangings, a textile and fiber art exhibit at the Museum of Modern Art in New York. His textile exhibits are part of the permanent collections at the Museum of Modern Art in New York, Art Institute of Chicago, Musée des Arts Décoratifs at the Louvre in Paris, and the Victoria and Albert Museum in London. Some of the private collections of his works are at American architect Frank Lloyd Wright's house Fallingwater, and Finnish-American architect Eero Saarinen's Miller house.

He was a North American Advisor for the Lausanne Biennale. He served as Vice President of Haystack Mountain School of Crafts, and as of 2015 served as trustee and honorary chairman. In 2015, he was awarded a fellowship of the Textile Society of America.

== LongHouse Reserve ==
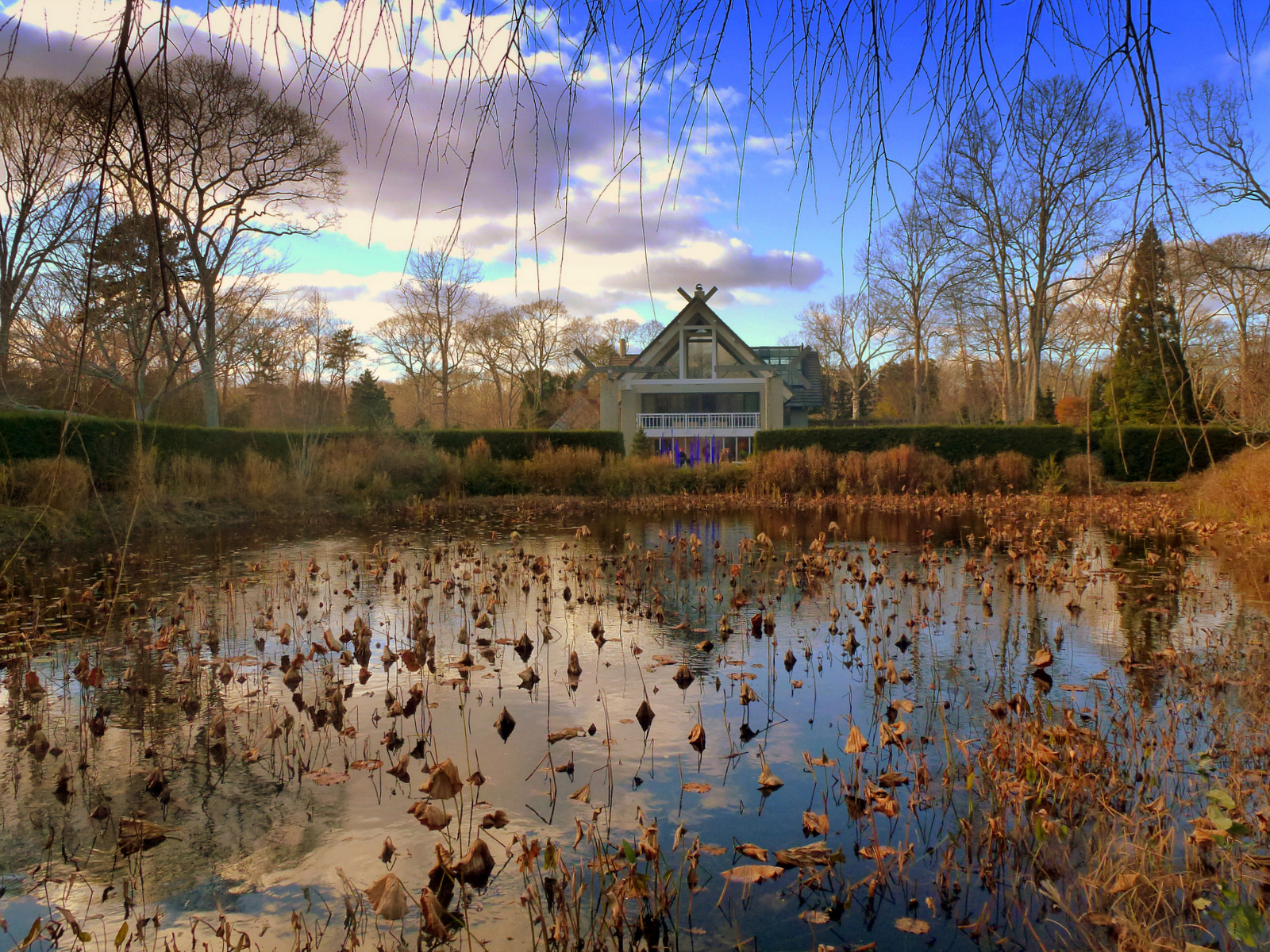
LongHouse in November 2012

Larsen set up the LongHouse Reserve as a non-profit sculpture garden and arboretum in East Hampton. The reserve included his house, and was completed in 1992. It was built as a collaboration with the architect Charles Forberg, their 30th project together. It has 13,000-square-foot (1,200 m^{2}) of floorspace spread across 18 spaces and four floors. The design is inspired by the Ise Shrine, a seventh century Shinto shrine in Japan. He initially bought the land as a way to prevent encroachments, but, later developed a landscaped sculpture garden surrounding the house and opened it to the public. The building is raised on stilts, and the spaces are divided by fabric sliding panels that showcase Larsen's fabrics and his collection of historical and contemporary crafts, including works by Lucie Rie, Wharton Esherick, Edward Wormley, and a glass chandelier by Dale Chihuly. Sculptures in the garden include works by Willem de Kooning, Sol LeWitt, Bryan Hunt, Shin Sang-ho and Yoko Ono. The plant selection is themed around red, with red-colored plants such as 'Lord Baltimore' hibiscus and Acer palmatum 'Sango kaku'.

== Death ==
Larsen died on December 22, 2020, at his home in East Hampton, NY. He was 93.

== Books ==
- Constantine, Mildred; Larsen, Jack Lenor (1974). Beyond Craft: The Art Fabric. Van Nostrand Reinhold.
- Larsen, Jack Lenor; Weeks, Jeanne (1975). Fabrics for Interiors: A Guide for Architects, Designers, and Consumers. Wiley. ISBN 978-0-471-28933-3.
- Jack Lenor Larsen: Thirty Years of Creative Textiles. Musee Des Arts Decoratifs. 1981. ISBN 978-0-295-95974-0.
- Larsen, Jack Lenor; Freudenheim, Betty (1986). Interlacing: The Elemental Fabric. Kodansha International. ISBN 978-0-87011-778-7.
- Larsen, Jack Lenor (1989). Material Wealth: Living with Luxurious Fabrics. Abbeville Press. ISBN 978-1-55859-007-6.
- Larsen, Jack Lenor (1998). Jack Lenor Larsen: A Weaver's Memoir. H.N. Abrams. ISBN 978-0-8109-3589-1.
- Larsen, Jack Lenor; Constantine, Mildred; McFadden, David Revere; Friedman, Mildred; Stack, Lotus (2004). Jack Lenor Larsen: Creator and Collector. Merrell Publishers. ISBN 978-1-85894-217-9.
