= List of Canadian women photographers =

This is a list of women photographers who were born in Canada or whose works are closely associated with that country.

== A ==
- Arwa Abouon (1982–2020), Libyan-Canadian photographer focused on Islamic culture
- Shelagh Alexander (1959–2017), photographic artist
- Vikky Alexander (born 1959), installation artist and photographer, often producing large murals
- Lillian B. Allen (1904–1994), painter, teacher and nature photographer
- Jennifer Alleyn (born 1969), filmmaker, writer and photographer
- Evelyn Andrus (1909–1972), photographer
- Sara Angelucci (born 1962), photography, video art
- Raymonde April (born 1953), photographer and academic, awarded the Order of Canada for her contribution to photography
- Joi Arcand (born 1982), nehiyaw photo-based artist
- Barbara Astman (born 1950), hybrid photography and new media
- Melissa Auf der Maur (born 1972), photographer and musician

== B ==
- Marian Penner Bancroft (born 1947), artist, photographer and educator
- Jessie Tarbox Beals (1870–1942), see United States
- Claire Beaugrand Champagne (born 1948), documentary photographer
- Sylvie Bélanger (1951–2020), video, photography, installation
- Dorothy Benson (1901–1996), wildlife photographer
- Edith Hallett Bethune (1890–1970), pictorialist photographer
- Lori Blondeau (born 1964), Cree/Saulteaux/Métis artist whose work includes performance art, installation and photography
- Theodosia Bond (1915–2009), landscape and plant photography
- Roberta Bondar (born 1945), landscape photographer, Canada's first female astronaut and the first neurologist in space
- Diane Borsato (born 1973), visual artist, explore pedagogy practices through performance, intervention, video, installation, and photography
- Dianne Bos (born 1956), photographer
- Tess Boudreau (1919–2007), documentary photography and artists' portrait photographs
- Deanna Bowen (born 1969), interdisciplinary artist
- Fiona Bowie, installation artist, uses film, video, photography and sculpture
- Amber Bracken (born 1984), photojournalist reporting on indigenous peoples
- Reva Brooks (1913–2004), photographed in Mexico, works in MoMA's The Family of Man exhibition
- Karin Bubaš (born 1976), contemporary artist, uses photography, drawing and painting
- Kay Burns, multidisciplinary artist

== C ==
- Geneviève Cadieux (born 1955), women's facial expressions
- Chrystal Callahan (fl 2000s), visual artist, photographer and fashion model
- Tenille Campbell (fl 2010s), indigenous writer, poet and photographer
- Blossom Caron (1905–1999), still life
- Jacynthe Carrier (born 1982), visual artist, photography, video and performance
- Rosetta Ernestine Carr (1845–1907), portrait and landscape photography
- Cynthia Chalk (1913–2018), nature photography
- June Clark (born 1941), photography, sculpture and collage
- Dana Claxton (born 1959), Hunkpapa Lakota filmmaker, photographer and performance artist
- Lynne Cohen (1944–2014), see United States
- Petra Collins (born 1992), portrait and fashion photography
- Sorel Cohen (born 1936), portraiture, feminist
- Stéphanie Colvey (born 1949), documentary photography
- Erin Combs (born c. 1952), early woman photojournalist
- Henrietta Constantine (1857–1934), landscape photographer
- Marlene Creates (born 1952), visual artist
- Caitlin Cronenberg (born 1984), photographer and filmmaker
- Jill Culiner (born 1945), folk artist, photographer and writer

== D ==
- Nathalie Daoust (born 1977), images taken in hotel rooms, a Tokyo love hotel, Berlin interiors
- Nancy Davenport (born 1965), visual artist and photographer
- Moyra Davey (born 1958), artist whose work includes photography, video and writing
- Sally Davies (born 1956), painter and photographer
- Clara Dennis (1881–1958), images of early 20th century Nova Scotia and Mi'kmaq people
- Susan Dobson (born 1965), photographer, focuses on themes of urban landscape and suburban culture
- Julie Doiron (born 1972)
- Marie-Alice Dumont (1892–1985), portrait and landscape photography
- Carol Dunlop (1946–1982), writer, translator, activist and photographer
- Chantal duPont (1942–2019), multidisciplinary artist

== E ==
- Jessica Eaton (born 1977), minimalist and geometric photographs relying on in-camera effects
- Julie Enfield (fl 2000s), portrait photographer and writer
- Janieta Eyre (born 1971), British-born Canadian art photographer

== F ==
- Rosalie Favell (born 1958), artist working with photography and digital collage

== G ==
- Madame Gagné (active 1886–1891)
- Millie Gamble (1887–1986), early amateur photographer from Prince Edward Island, images of life in the Tyron area from 1905
- Lorraine Gilbert (born 1955), French-born Canadian landscape artist and photographer
- Henrietta Gilmour (1852–1926), pioneering woman photographer
- Angela Grauerholz (born 1952), German-born photographer, graphic designer and educator
- Jill Greenberg (born 1967), Canadian-born portrait photographer and pop artist
- Michelle Groskopf (fl 2017), street photographer
- Aline Gubbay (1920–2005), photographer, art historian and writer
- Mattie Gunterman (1872–1945), amateur photographer
- Clara Gutsche (born 1949), American-Canadian photographer, educator and art critic

== H ==
- Samra Habib (fl 2014), Pakistani-Canadian photographer, writer and activist
- Jane Eaton Hamilton (born 1954), writer, poet, visual artist and photographer
- Naomi Harris (born 1973), portraits of people from sub-cultures
- Kiana Hayeri (born 1988), photojournalist
- Isabelle Hayeur (born 1969), visual artist working with photographs and experimental film
- Heidi Hollinger (born 1968), political photographer
- Elsie Holloway (1882–1971), photographer, known for her portraits and historic photos of Newfoundland people and its surroundings
- April Hickox (1955–2025), lens based artist, founding director of Gallery 44 Centre For Contemporary Photography

== J ==
- Valerie Jodoin Keaton (fl 2009), rock star photographer and musician
- Joanne Jackson Johnson (born 1943), photographer

== K ==
- Ruth Kaplan (born 1955), artist and documentary photographer
- Zahra Kazemi (1948–2003)
- Minna Keene (1849–1943), German-Canadian pictorial portrait photographer
- Violet Keene (1893–1987), English-born Canadian photographer of artists and statesmen
- Holly King (born 1957), artist creating photographs of constructed landscapes
- Marianna Knottenbelt (born 1949), Dutch-Canadian photographer, architect and real-estate developer
- Nadya Kwandibens, First Nations photographer

== L ==
- Donna Laframboise (fl 1990s), photographer and journalist
- Gisèle Lamoureux (1942–2018), photographer, botanist and ecologist
- Rita Leistner (fl 2000s), photojournalist and filmmaker
- Laura Letinsky (born 1962), contemporary photography, best known for her still lifes
- Élise L'Heureux (1827–1896), 19th century Quebec City photographer
- Elaine Ling (1946–2016), photographer
- Judith Lodge (born 1941), American Canadian painter and photographer

== M ==
- Margaret Malandruccolo (fl 2000s), photographer and music video director
- Lesia Maruschak (born 1961), known for her Project Maria
- Mia Matthes (1920–2010), architecture and landscape photographer
- Edith Maybin (born 1969), photographer
- Hannah Maynard (1834–1918), portrait and experimental photographer
- Jo-Anne McArthur (born 1976), photojournalist and animal rights activist
- Helen McCall (1899–1956)
- Susan McEachern (born 1951), American-Canadian photographer, work often includes text
- Sheila McKinnon, Canadian born photographer and journalist
- Meryl McMaster (born 1988), photographer whose best known work explores her Indigenous heritage
- Jean Gainfort Merrill (1913–?), photojournalist
- Léna Mill-Reuillard (fl 2016), cinematographer and photographer
- Lorraine Monk (1922–2020), photographer, helped establish the Canadian Museum of Contemporary Photography, Order of Canada for contributions to photography
- Geraldine Moodie (1854–1945), pioneering photographer, images include the Innu people around Hudson Bay
- Julie Moos (born 1966), art photography
- Alexandra Morrison, photographer
- Marie-Jeanne Musiol (born 1950), Swiss-Canadian photographer
- Nadia Myre (born 1974), contemporary visual artist

== N ==
- Shelley Niro (born 1954), Mohawk multidisciplinary artist
- Farah Nosh (active since 2002), Iraqi-Canadian photojournalist

== P ==
- Indrani Pal-Chaudhuri (born 1983), Indian-Canadian-British feminist director and fashion photographer
- Thelma Pepper (1920–2020)
- Nancy Petry (1931–2024), known for innovation within the fields of painting, photography, film and performance art
- Jenny Pike (1922–2004), developed D-Day photos during WWII, later worked as darkroom technician for Canadian police

== R ==
- Nina Raginsky (born 1941), worked freelance for the National Film Board of Canada, best known for frontal, full-figure portraits=
- Sylvie Readman (born 1958), photographer exhibited in the National Gallery
- Gladys Reeves (1890–1974), professional photographer in Edmonton
- Dominique Rey (born 1976), photographer
- Charlotte Rosshandler (born 1943), Canadian-American photographer
- Alix Cléo Roubaud (1952–1983), photographer

== S ==
- June Sauer (born 1920s), Montreal fashion photographer specializing in fur
- Faye Schulman (1919–2015), Jewish partisan photographer
- Sandra Semchuk (born 1948), photographer
- Erin Shirreff (born 1975), multidisciplinary artist, primarily works with photography, sculpture and video
- Floria Sigismondi (born 1965), Italian-Canadian film director, screenwriter, music video director, artist and photographer
- Leah Singer (born 1962), photographer and multimedia artist
- Clara Sipprell (1885–1975), early 20th century landscape photographer, also known for her portraits of famous actors, artists, writers and scientists
- Lana Šlezić (fl 2000s), photographer and filmmaker
- Mary Spencer (1857–1938), photographer, photojournalist and artist
- Barbara Spohr (1955–1987), photographed Alberta city scenes and people
- Elaine Stocki (born 1979), educator known for her paintings and photographs

== T ==
- Althea Thauberger (born 1970), visual artist

== V ==
- Adriene K. Veninger (born 1958), artist and photographer

== W ==
- Margaret Watkins (1884–1969), remembered for her contributions to advertising photography
- Edith Watson (1861–1943), known for her photojournalistic images of everyday life, working people, and women, particularly in Canada
- Sally Elizabeth Wood (1857–1928), early woman photographer in Quebec's Eastern Townships

== Y ==
- Jin-me Yoon (born 1960), South Korean-born multidisciplinary artist, who often works with photography, video and elements of performance

== See also ==
- List of women photographers
