= Clutton =

Clutton may refer to:

== Places ==
- Clutton, Somerset, a village in Bath and North East Somerset, England
- Clutton, Cheshire

== People with the surname ==
- Alma Clutton (1873–1955), Canadian photographer
- Eric Clutton (fl. 1957–1979), English aircraft designer
- George Clutton (1909–1970), English diplomat
- Henry Clutton (1819–1893), English designer and architect
- Henry Hugh Clutton (1850–1909), English surgeon
- James Clutton (1869–1943), English footballer
- Marcus Clutton (born 1989), British racing driver
- Nigel Clutton (born 1954), English former footballer
- Ralph Clutton (1902–1957), English cricketer
- Lady Sarah Clutton (1941–2015), English aristocrat and philanthropist
- William Clutton (fl. 1765), English surveyor, founder of the firms:
  - Cluttons, London-based firm of chartered surveyors
  - RH & RW Clutton, Sussex-based firm of chartered surveyors

== See also ==
- Clutton-Brock
