= Knottenbelt =

Knottenbelt is a surname. It may refer to:

- Josef Knottenbelt (1910–1998), Dutch tennis player
- Marianna Knottenbelt (born 1949), Dutch-Canadian photographer, architect and real-estate developer.
- Martin Knottenbelt (1920–2004), Dutch commando and anti-war activist
