= Sauers =

Sauers is a surname. Notable people with the surname include:

- Gene Sauers (born 1962), American professional golfer
- Isidor Sauers (born 1948), Austrian-American physicist

== See also ==
- Sauer (surname)
