= Sauer (surname) =

Sauer is a German surname. Notable people with this surname (or Sauers) include:

== Persons ==
=== A–J ===
- Albert Sauer (1898–1945), German Nazi SS concentration camp commandant
- August Sauer (1855–1926), Austrian Germanist and literary historian
- Bernard Sauer (1924–1991), American stage actor
- Carl O. Sauer (1889–1975), American geographer
- Christoph Sauer (1695–1758), German-born American printer and publisher
- Colin Sauer (1924–2015), violinist and chamber musician
- Conrad Frederick Sauer (1866–1927), American pharmacist, founder of C.F. Sauer Company
- Craig Sauer (born 1973), American football player
- D. John Sauer (born 1974), American lawyer, US solicitor general
- Derk Sauer (1952–2025), Dutch journalist and media proprietor
- Dirk Sauer (born 1977), German-born musician
- Ed Sauer (1919–1988), American baseball player
- Eddie Sauer (1898–1980), American football player
- Emil von Sauer (1862–1942), German musician and composer
- Frank Sauer, Canadian football player
- Frederick C. Sauer (1860–1942), German-born American architect
- Gene Sauers (born 1962), American golfer
- Geoffrey Sauer (born 1968), American educator
- George Sauer (1910–1994), American football player and coach
- George Sauer Jr. (1943–2013), American football player
- Gunnar Sauer (born 1964), German footballer
- Gustavo Sauer (born 1993), Brazilian footballer
- Hank Sauer (1917–2001), American baseball player
- Hans Sauer (1857–1939), South African born medical doctor, lawyer, adventurer and businessman
- Isidor Sauers (born 1948), Austrian-born American physicist
- Jane Sauer (born 1937), American fiber artist, sculptor
- Jeff Sauer (1943–2017), American ice hockey player and coach
- Joachim Sauer (born 1949), German scientist
- Johannes Sauer (born 1968), South African-born Canadian sport shooter
- John Sauer (1925–1996), American football player and coach
- Jonathan Deininger Sauer (1918–2008), American botanist and plant geographer
- Julia Sauer (1891–1983), American writer of children's fiction and librarian
- June Sauer (born 1920s), Canadian fashion photographer

=== K–Z ===
- Kai Sauer (born 1967), Finnish diplomat
- Klaus Peter Sauer (1941–2022), German biologist
- Kurt Sauer (born 1981), American ice hockey player
- Louie Sauer (1915–1985), American basketball player
- Louis Sauer (born 1928), American architect
- Louis W. Sauer (1885–1980), American medical doctor, developer of pertussis vaccine
- Magdalena Sauer (1890–1983), first woman qualified to practice as an architect in South Africa
- Mark Sauer, American physician who specializes in reproductive medicine
- Martin Sauer (explorer) (fl. 1785–1806), English civil servant, stockbroker and explorer
- Martin Sauer (rowing), (born 1982), German rowing cox
- Mary Sauer (born 1975), American pole vaulter
- Matt Sauer (born 1999), American baseball player
- Maximilian Sauer (born 1994), German footballer
- Michael Sauer (athlete) (born 1941), German triple jumper
- Michael Sauer (ice hockey) (born 1987), American ice hockey player
- Michael T. Sauer (1937–2021), American judge
- Mike Sauer (wine), Washington wine grower
- Nick Sauer (born 1982), Republican politician
- Norman Sauer, American forensic anthropologist
- Paige Sauer (born 1977), basketball player
- Peter Sauer (1900–1949), Russian-born American wrestler
- Ralph Sauer (fl. 1970s–2000s), American musician
- Robert Max Friedrich Sauer (1898–1970), German mathematician
- Robert T. Sauer (born 1948), American biochemist
- Sascha Sauer (born 1981), German American football player
- Stefan Sauer (born 1966), German politician
- Tilman Sauer (born 1963), German theoretical physicist and historian of natural sciences
- Uwe Sauer (born 1943), German equestrian athlete
- Uwe Sauer (basketball) (born 1963), German basketball player
- Volker Sauer (born 1956), German rower
- Wilhelm Sauer (1831–1916), German pipe organ builder

== See also ==
- Saur (disambiguation)
