= Boudreau =

Boudreau is a surname of French origin. Notable people with the surname include:

- Abbie Boudreau (b. 1978), American investigative journalist
- Bernie Boudreau (b. 1944), Canadian lawyer and politician from Nova Scotia
- Bruce Boudreau (b. 1955), Canadian ice hockey coach
- Claire Boudreau (1965–2020), Canadian historian, genealogist, and officer of arms
- Jean Boudreau (1748–1827), political figure in Lower Canada
- Jim Boudreau, Canadian politician from Nova Scotia
- Léone Boudreau-Nelson (1915–2004), American-born Canadian phonetician
- Lou Boudreau (1917–2001), American baseball player
- Lucien Boudreau (1874–1962), Canadian politician from Alberta
- Lyne Chantal Boudreau, Canadian politician
- Robert Boudreau (1927–2024), American conductor.
- Rodolphe Boudreau (1865–1923), Canadian civil servant from Quebec, Clerk of the Privy Council
- Roy Boudreau (1946–2023), Canadian teacher and politician from New Brunswick
- Tess Boudreau (1919–2007), Canadian photographer
- Victor Boudreau (b. 1970), Canadian politician from New Brunswick
- Walter Boudreau (b. 1947), Québécois composer, saxophonist, and conductor
