= Beaudreau =

Beaudreau is a surname. Notable people with the surname include:

- Joseph Beaudreau (1826–1869), Canadian politician
- Robert H. Beaudreau (1912–1980), American intelligence agent and judge
- Tommy Beaudreau, American attorney

== See also ==
- Boudreau
