= Mary Spencer (disambiguation) =

Mary Spencer may also refer to:

- Mary Spencer (born 1984), Canadian boxer
- Mary C. Spencer (1842–1923), American librarian
- Mary Spencer Nay (1913–1993), American painter and printmaker
- Mary Spencer (photographer) (1857–1938), Canadian photographer
- Mary Spencer Watson (1913–2006), English sculptor

== Fictional characters ==
- Mary Spencer, in the Japanese anime series Trinity Blood
