= Spohr (surname) =

Spohr is a German surname. Notable people with the surname include:

- Arnold Spohr (1923–2010), Canadian ballet dancer, choreographer, and artistic director of German descent
- Barbara Spohr (1955–1987), Canadian photographer
- Eduardo Spohr (born 1976), Brazilian fantasy and science fiction writer
- Louis Spohr (1784–1859), German composer, violinist, and conductor
- Max Spohr (1850–1905), German bookseller and publisher
