= Borsato =

Borsato is a surname. Notable people with the surname include:

- Diane Borsato (born 1973), Canadian visual artist
- Giuseppe Borsato (1771–1849), Italian painter
- Luciano Borsato (born 1966), Canadian ice hockey player
- Marco Borsato (born 1966), Dutch singer
