= Mabin =

Mabin is a surname. Notable people with the surname include:

- Dylan Mabin (born 1997), American football player
- Greg Mabin (born 1994), American football player
- Jordan Mabin (born 1988), American football player
- Victoria Mabin, New Zealand professor of management

== See also ==
- Mabin language
- Maybin
