= Gubbay =

Gubbay is a surname. Notable people with the surname include:

- Aline Gubbay (1920–2005), Canadian photographer, art historian, and writer
- Anthony Gubbay (born 1932), Zimbabwean judge
- Raymond Gubbay (born 1946), English music promoter
