= Minna Keene =

Canadian photographer (1861–1943)

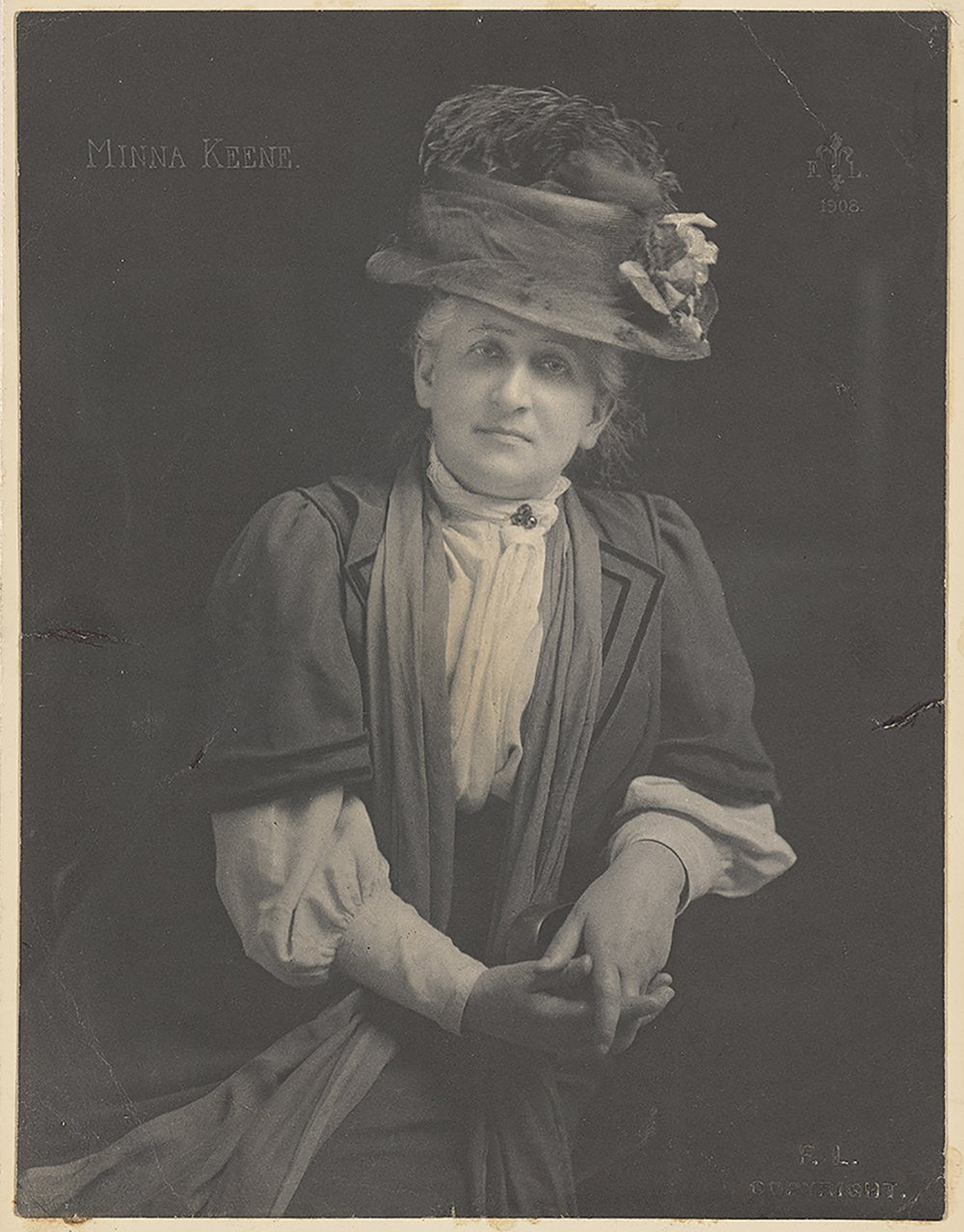
- Born: February 5, 1859; Rumbeck (Hessisch Oldendorf), Germany
- Died: November 1943 (aged 83–84) Oakville, Ontario, Canada
- Known for: Photography

Minna Keene, née Töneböne, (5 February 1859 – November 1943) was a German-born, self-taught Canadian pictorial portrait photographer, considered "hugely successful".

Keene was born in Rumbeck, Waldeck, now part of the city of Hessisch Oldendorf, Germany, in 1859. She lived in the United Kingdom, South Africa, and Canada. She married Caleb Keene in 1887. She died in Oakville, Ontario, Canada, in 1943.

Keene was an early female member of the Linked Ring, a photographic society created to show that photography was just as much an art as it was a science, and to propel photography further into the fine art world. She was also a member of the London Salon of Photography and the first woman to be admitted as a fellow to the Royal Photographic Society, where she exhibited in annual exhibitions from 1911 to 1929.

== Biography ==
Doris Wilhelmine Charlotte Töneböne (from 1862, Bergmann), also known as a photographer by her married name, Minna Keene, was born in Rumbeck, Waldeck (now part of the city of Hessisch-Oldendorf), on 5 February 1859, the illegitimate daughter of Dorothea Charlotte Töneböne (1832–1874). Her mother married Louis Bergmann (1822–1879), a police constable and former musician, in Arolsen, Waldeck, in 1862; she was confirmed as Minna Bergmann in Arolsen on Easter Sunday, 1872. Minna married Caleb Keene (b. 1862) in Chelsea, London, in 1887. Caleb was a "decorator's apprentice" and brother of the landscape painter cum "photographic artist" Elmer Ezra Keene (1853–1929).

In South Africa, Minna's portraits of prominent white South Africans appeared on the covers of magazines, and her photos of non-white subjects, such as Our Malay Washerwoman, 1903–1913, were acclaimed and sold as postcards. Minna’s first mention in British photographic literature occurs in the late 1890s, when she is found submitting work (with some success) to competitions in the art journal The Studio and to a selection of regional photographic societies, including the Chelmsford Camera Club and Southsea Exhibition. The subjects of her early work in England included flowers, plants, and birds; her botanical and ornithological work was used in British textbooks into the 1920s.

After immigrating to Canada in about 1913, Keene was commissioned by the Canadian Pacific Railway to photograph the Rockies (1914–15) to market the mountain journey to tourists. In 1920, she opened a studio in Toronto, relocating to Oakville in 1922.

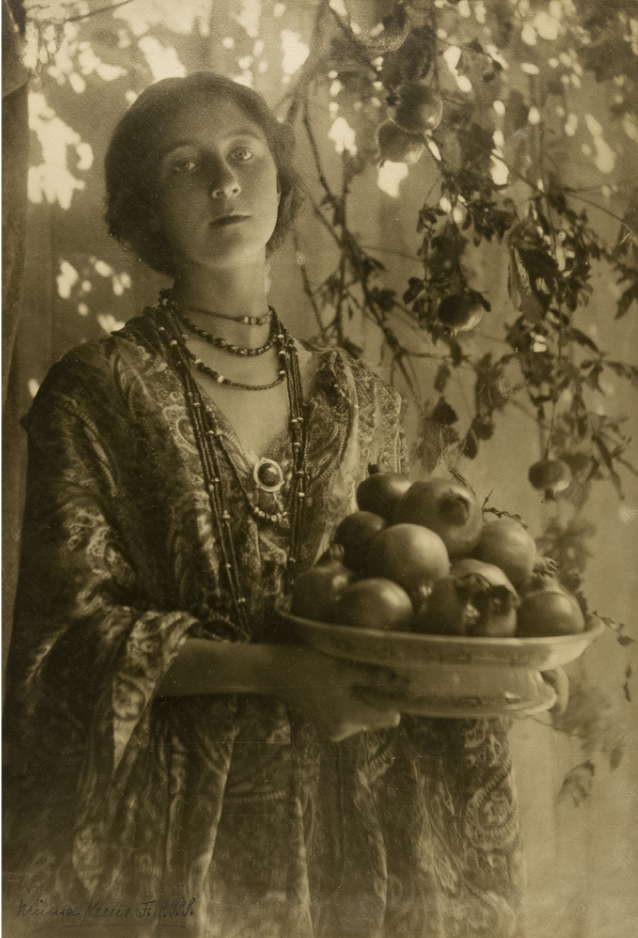
Pomegranates by Minna Keene (1910).

Despite innovating in and enriching photography, female photographers in Keene's time were not taken as seriously as their male counterparts. Keene won numerous prizes and established studios in South Africa and Canada; yet when she was featured in an article in Maclean's magazine in 1926, she was described as "a charming hostess" and a "home lover". Her daughter Violet Keene was also a photographer. The work of the Keenes was rediscovered by the public after being featured in a 1983 exhibition on women photographers, organized by curator Laura Jones, which was shown at venues including the Art Gallery of Ontario and the London Regional Art Gallery. Their archives are kept at The Image Centre at Toronto Metropolitan University.

== Awards ==
- 1908: Fellow, Royal Photographic Society of Great Britain

== Publications with photographs by Keene ==
- Mortimer, F. J., ed. (1926). Photograms of the Year 1926: The annual review for 1927 of the world's pictorial photographic work. London: Iliffe & Sons. Contains photograph "Gossips" by Keene
- Rediscovery: Canadian Women Photographers 1841–1941. North London, Canada: London Regional Art Gallery, 1983. By Laura Jones. ISBN 978-0-920872-25-3. With work by 13 women: Rossetta E. Carr, Clara Dennis, M. J. Dukelow, Millie Gamble, Mattie Gunterman, Elsie Hollway, Minna Keene, Hannah Maynard, Annie G. McDougall, Geraldine Moodie, Gladys Reeves, Madge Smith, Edith S. Watson; exhibition catalogue; paperback, 36 pages. Includes 14 photographs and brief biographies of 12 of the photographers.
- Royal Photographic Society. Women by Women. Rohnert Park, CA: Pomegranate, 1996. With work by 12 women: Anne Brigman, Pamela Booth, Eleanor Parke Custis, Gertrude Käsebier, Madame D'Ora, Adelaide Hanscom, Minna Keene, Rosalinda Maingot, Gisela Markham-Szanto, Eveleen Myers, Hilda Stevenson, Dorothy Wilding; calendar format; 24 pages.
- Photography in Canada, 1839–1989: An Illustrated History. Toronto: Art Canada Institute, 2023. ISBN 978-1-4871-0309-5 Sarah Bassnett and Sarah Parsons.

== Exhibitions ==
- 1910: Fifty-fifth Annual Exhibition of the Royal Photographic Society of Great Britain
- 1911: Fifty-sixth Annual Exhibition of the Royal Photographic Society of Great Britain
- 1913: Fifty-eighth Annual Exhibition of the Royal Photographic Society of Great Britain
- 1983: Rediscovery: Canadian Women Photographers 1841–1941, London, Ontario, Canada
- 2016: Painting with Light: Art and Photography from the Pre-Raphaelites to the Modern Age, Tate Britain, London.

== Collections ==
- Science and Society Picture Library, Science Museum Group, London
- The National Archives, Kew, London
