= Bill Miner =

American bandit (1846–1913)

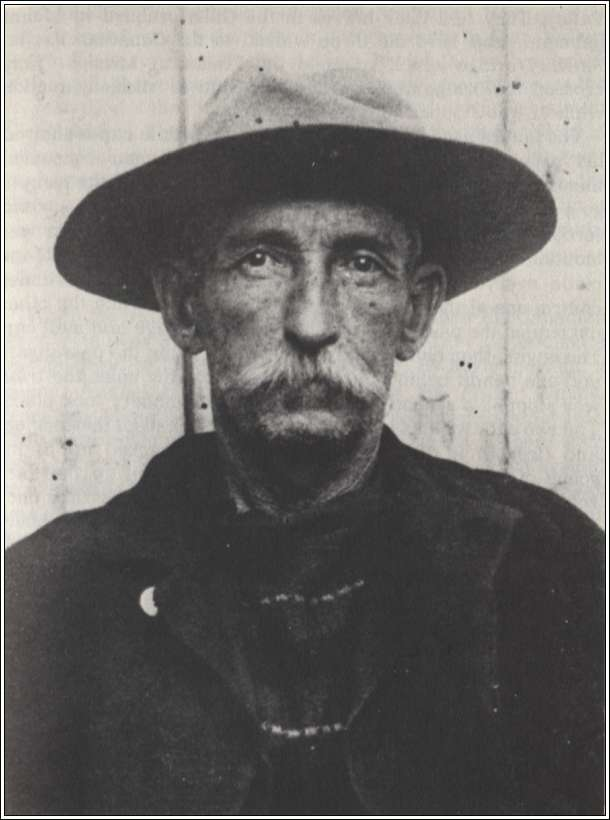
- Bill Miner in 1906 photographed by Mary Spencer
- Born: Ezra Allen Miner; December 27, 1846; Vevay Township, Michigan
- Died: September 2, 1913 (aged 66); Milledgeville, Georgia, US
- Other names: W. A. Morgan, George W. Edwards, Ezra Allen Miner, Grey Fox, Gentleman Robber, Gentleman Bandit
- Occupations: stagecoach robber, train robber
- Known for: reputed to have been the originator of the phrase "Hands up!"

Ezra Allen Miner (December 27, 1846 – September 2, 1913), more popularly known as Bill Miner, was an American bandit, originally from Michigan, who served several prison terms for stagecoach robbery. Known for his unusual politeness while committing robberies, he was widely nicknamed the Grey Fox, Gentleman Robber or the Gentleman Bandit. He is reputed to have been the originator of the phrase "Hands up!" Legend has it that Bill Miner admonished his cohorts to fire their guns when in danger of capture but "do not kill a man".

== Life ==
Ezra Allen Miner was born on December 27, 1846, in Vevay Township, Michigan. Known as Allen to his family, he began using William (Bill) as his first name by April 1864, when he was recruited into the Union Army at Sacramento. He deserted from the army three months later. Miner was arrested for the first time in 1866 in San Joaquin County, California and served time there. He was shortly released but served more time at Placer County, California and later at Calaveras County, California. He was discharged in 1880. He then formed a partnership with Bill Leroy (as W. A. Morgan) to rob a stagecoach. Leroy was caught and lynched, but Miner escaped. He was later caught for another robbery in Tuolumne County, California and was released from San Quentin in 1901.

After his third prison term, Miner moved to the province of British Columbia in Canada, where he adopted the pseudonym George Edwards and is believed to have staged British Columbia's first-ever train robbery on September 10, 1904 at Silverdale about 35 kilometres (22 mi) east of Vancouver, just west of Mission City. It is often claimed that Miner was the robber, but neither he nor his accomplices were ever tied conclusively to the Silverdale heist. It is also widely reported that Silverdale's train robbery was the first in Canada, but Peter Grauer's definitive study ("Interred With Their Bones", 2005) cites a train robbery in Port Credit, Ontario 30 years prior as the first.

Miner was eventually caught after a botched payroll train robbery near Kamloops at Monte Creek (then known as "Ducks"). Choosing the wrong car, they managed only to rob $15 plus a bottle of kidney pills that Miner picked up off of a shelf. Miner and his two accomplices, Tom "Shorty" Dunn and Louis Colquhoun, were located near Douglas Lake, British Columbia after an extensive manhunt. A posse surrounded them while they were lunching in the woods. Miner presented himself as George Edwards and claimed that he and his cohorts were prospectors. The officer in charge of the posse suspected the three were behind the train robbery and put them under arrest.

Dunn attempted to fire at the police and was shot in the leg. He gave up quickly after being wounded. Colquhoun was disarmed by an officer standing nearby and Miner never drew his weapon. Miner's arrest and subsequent trial in Kamloops caused a media spectacle. Apparently the most damning evidence against him was the bottle of kidney pills that Miner had picked up during the Ducks robbery. Upon his conviction, he, Dunn and Colquhoun were transported by train to the provincial penitentiary in New Westminster. By that time, Miner's celebrity status had risen to the point that supporters attended his arrival in Kamloops.

While serving time in the B.C. Penitentiary, Miner escaped in 1907 and was never recaptured in Canada. He moved back to the United States, becoming once again involved in robberies in the South at Gainesville in 1909. There, he served more prison time, and escaped twice.

He died in the prison farm at Milledgeville, Georgia, of gastritis, contracted from drinking brackish water during his previous escape attempt.

== Legacy ==
Miner's time in British Columbia propelled his celebrity there in many ways since. British Columbia restaurant chain, the Keg Steakhouse & Bar, have named drinks and their Billy Miner Pie after the train robber. Their early decor also showed many photos of Miner.

A mural depicting Miner's robbery near Monte Creek has been painted on the exterior south wall of Cactus Jacks Saloon & Dance Hall located in the building at the corner of 5th Avenue & Lansdowne Street in Kamloops, British Columbia.

Maple Ridge, British Columbia features the Billy Miner Pub which is located in historic Port Haney on the bank of the Fraser River. The pub is located in the original Bank Of Montreal building built in the early 1900s.

It has been speculated that Miner left a hidden cache of loot in the forests near and around Green Lake / 70 Mile House BC after the first robbery; local historians believe he used these monies to fund his escape, while others believe that today there is still hidden loot to be found there.

An original song titled "The Ballad of Bill Miner" was written by singer/songwriter Phillip Mills (Eugene Quinn) and recorded by the San Francisco bay area band "The Blackout Cowboys".

Miner was the subject of the 1982 Canadian film The Grey Fox, in which he was played by Richard Farnsworth.

Miner is buried in Memory Hill Cemetery in Milledgeville, Georgia. It was discovered that his headstone was in the wrong location, name spelled wrong, and with the wrong year of his death. A new headstone was put in the correct spot and spelled correctly. The old one was kept where it was.

Mount Miner near Princeton, formerly Bald Mountain or Baldy, was renamed in Bill Miner's honor in response to a motion by the Princeton Board of Trade in 1952. Miner had lived on the ranch owned by Jack Budd, which was on the other side of this mountain from Princeton, while planning the robbery at Ducks. Billy's Restaurant in Princeton, British Columbia is also named after him.

Tin Whistle Brewing Co. a microbrewery from Penticton B.C. launched a Red Ale titled "Hands Up!" as a commemoration to Miner.

His principal biography is The Grey Fox: The True Story of Bill Miner, Last of the Old Time Bandits, by Mark Dugan and John Boessenecker (Norman: University of Oklahoma Press, 1992).

In 2014, thieves stole Miner's watch from the Royal BC Museum in Victoria. The watch, along with the several others, was recovered by the Victoria Police and the thieves arrested by the Port Alberni RCMP.

In 2018, Robert Buckley composed The Legend of Billy Miner (scored for concert band) as a commission to mark the 40th anniversary of the Kamloops Interior Summer School of Music. It starts with a ragtime theme setting the story in its time period, followed by a train robbery and police chase, then a doleful theme representing Miner languishing in prison, and finally a return to the upbeat ragtime symbolizing his return to life outside prison.

In early 2024, a pub called The Notorious Grey Fox Taps and Patio opened in what used to be the penitentiary in New Westminster where Miner served and escaped.
