= Maybin =

Maybin is a surname, and may refer to:

- Aaron Maybin (born 1988), American football defensive end
- Cameron Maybin (born 1987), American Major League Baseball player
- Edith Maybin (born 1969), Canadian photographer
- Gareth Maybin (born 1980), Northern Irish professional golfer
