= Cégep du Vieux Montréal =

Public college in Montréal, Quebec

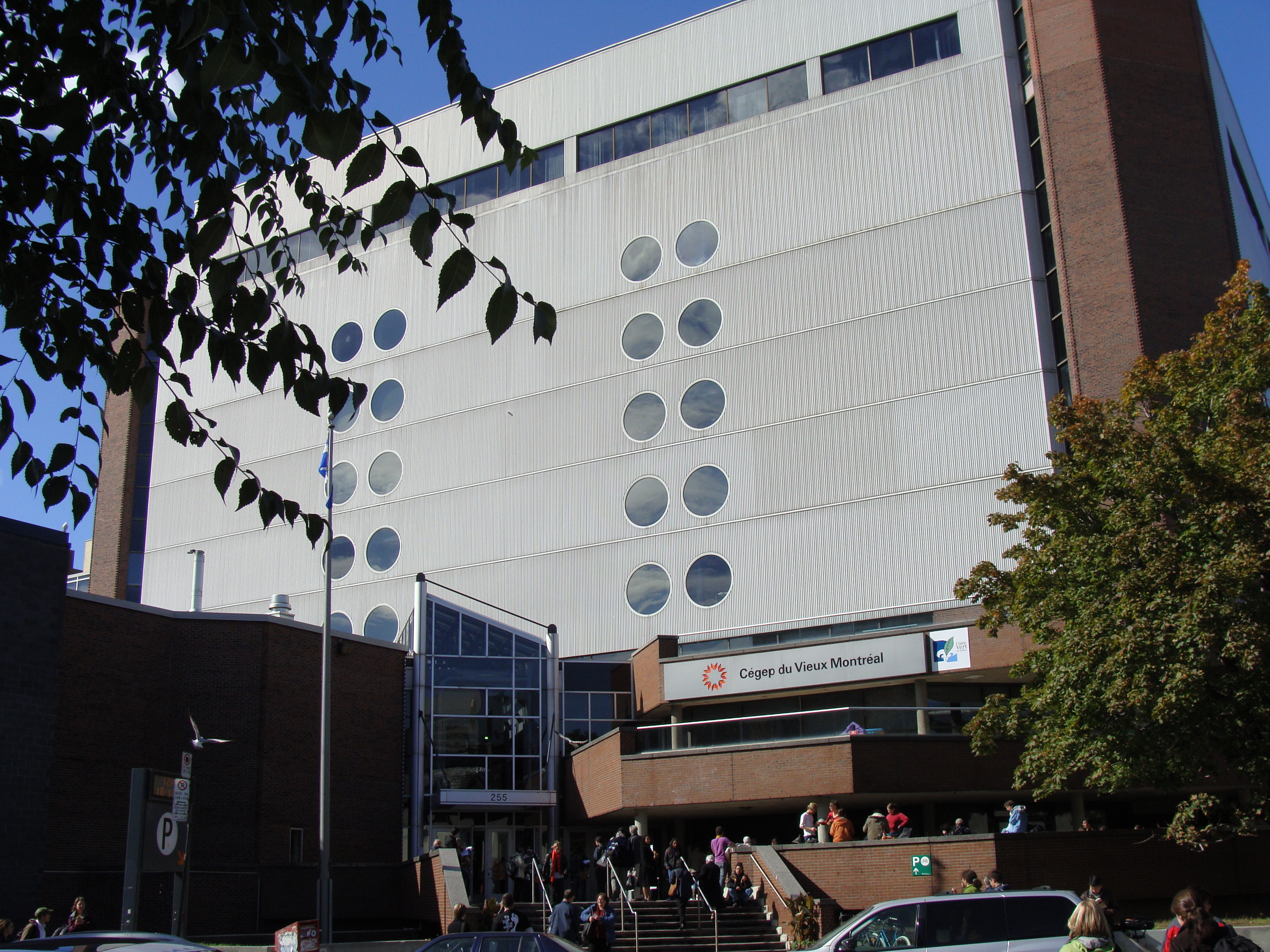
- Type: CEGEP
- Established: 1968
- Affiliations: ACCC, CCAA, QSSF
- Students: 6100
- Undergraduates: Pre-university students; technical
- Location: Montreal, Quebec, Canada
- Campus: Urban
- Sports teams: Spartiates
- Colours: red and orange
- Website: www.cvm.qc.ca/

Cégep du Vieux Montréal (French pronunciation: [seʒɛp dy vjø mɔ̃ʁeal]) is a CEGEP (Collège d'enseignement général et professionnel, or College of General and Vocational Education) located at 255 Ontario Street East, in Montreal, Quebec, Canada. The College of General and Vocational Education is affiliated with the ACCC and CCAA.

== History ==
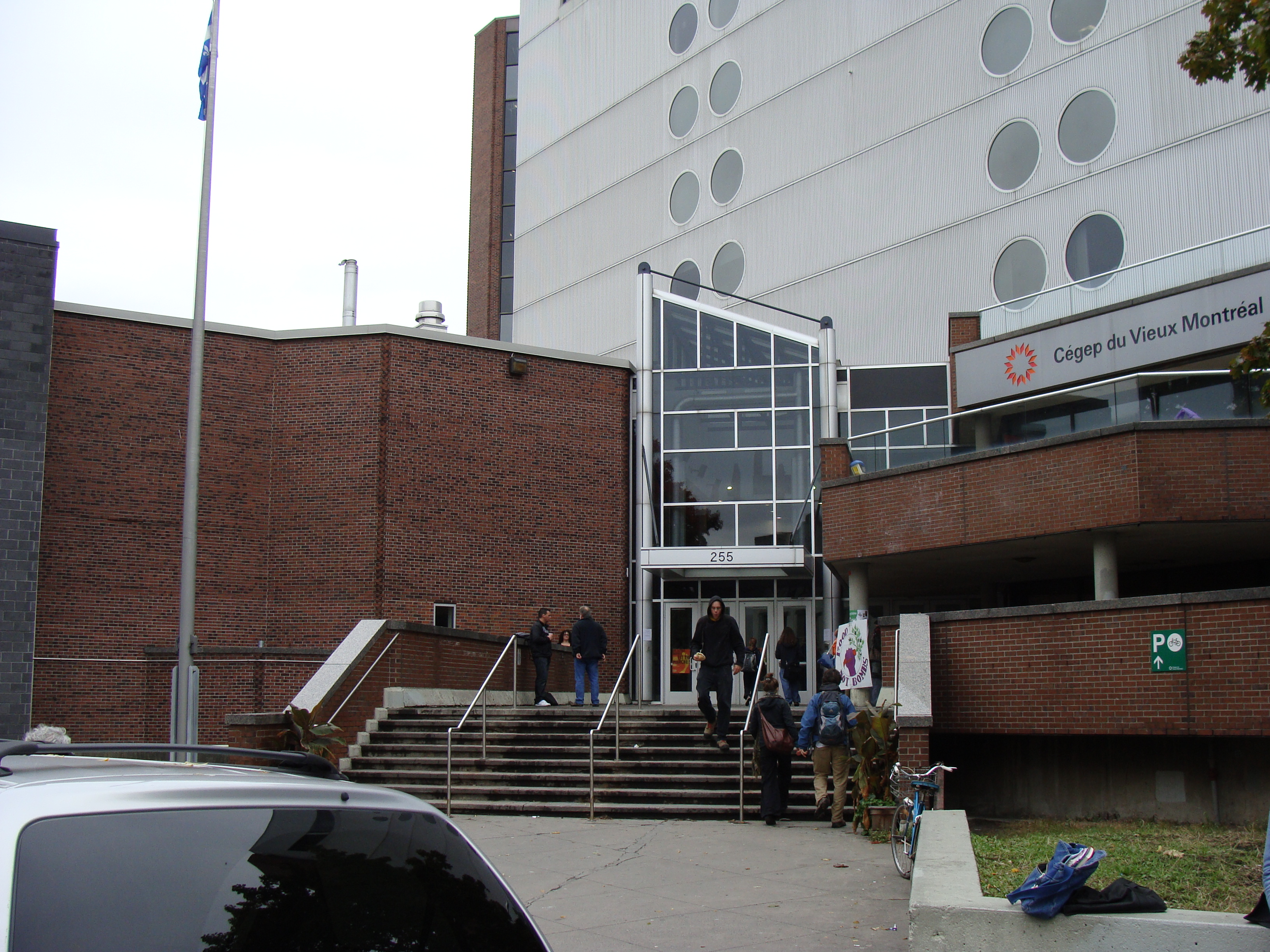
South entrance

In 1967, several institutions were merged and became public, when the Quebec system of CEGEPs was created. Established in 1968, it was composed of five distinct pavilions. Since 1976, it has been regrouped into a single, 11-story building, but with three secondary pavilions.

== Programs ==
The CEGEP offers two types of programs: pre-university and technical. The pre-university programs, which take two years to complete, cover the subject matter which roughly corresponds to the additional year of high school given elsewhere in Canada in preparation for a chosen field in university, as well as an introductory specialization that generally happens in freshman year. The technical programs, which take three years to complete, apply to students who wish to pursue a skill or trade. Continuing education and services to business are also provided.

== Notable alumni ==
- Claire Beaugrand Champagne - photographer
- Julie Doucet - underground cartoonist/artist
- Alain Kashama - CFL player
- Amir Khadir - MNA for Quebec Solidaire
- Marie-Josée Croze - actress
- Nathalie Daoust - photographer
- Enock Makonzo - CFL player for the Edmonton Elks
- Ethan Makonzo - drafted in the 6th round of the CFL draft at the 46th position
- Benjamin St-Juste - American football player
- Bruno Heppell - CFL player
- Deitan Dubuc - CFL player

== See also ==
- List of colleges in Quebec
- Higher education in Quebec
