= Ernest Brown (photographer) =

Canadian photographer (1877–1951)

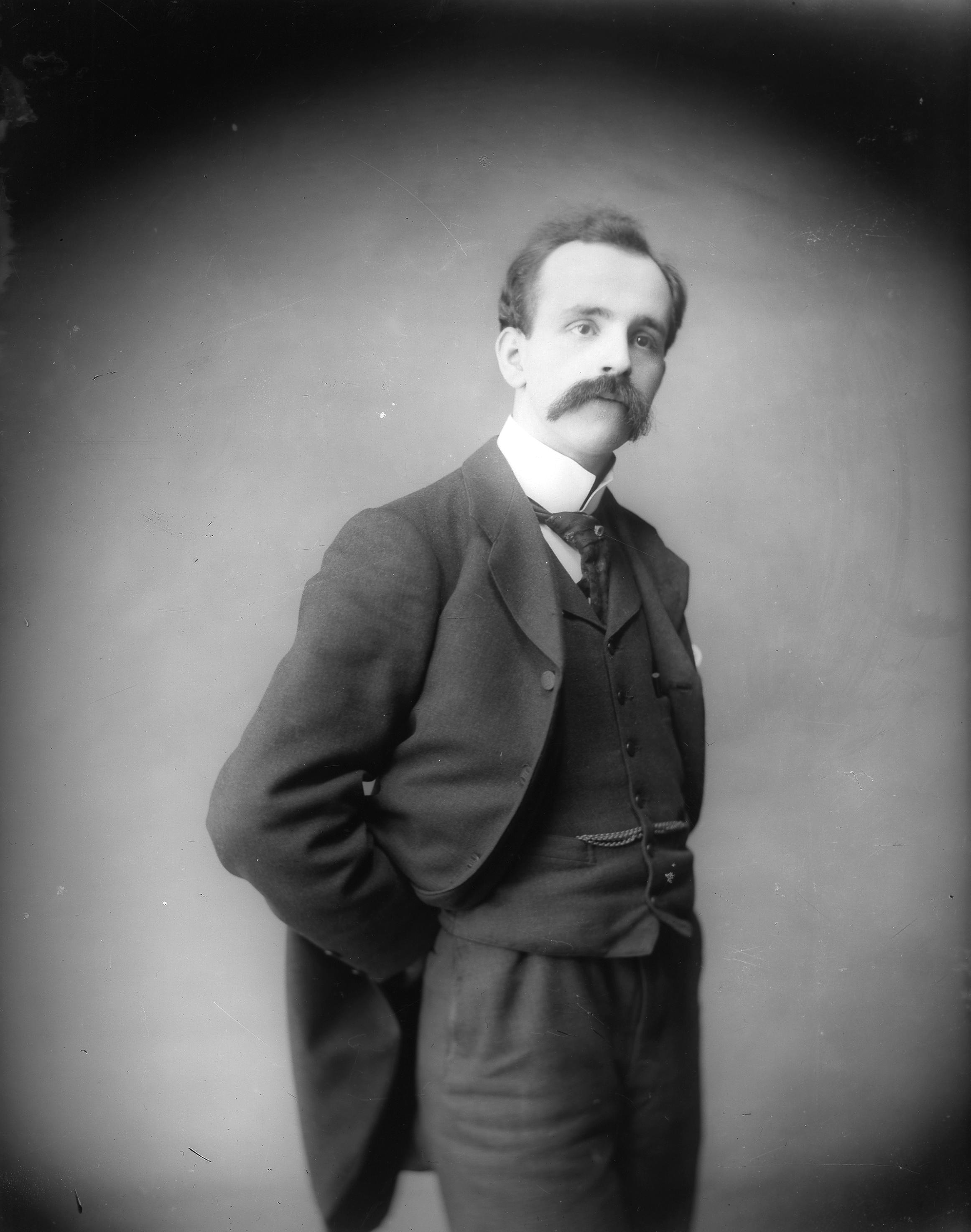
- Ernest Brown (1910)
- Born: 8 September 1877; Middlesbrough, Yorkshire, England
- Died: January 3, 1951 (aged 73); Edmonton, Alberta
- Citizenship: Canadian
- Occupation: Photographer
- Years active: 1904–1947
- Political party: Independent Labour Party
- Spouse: Mary "Molly" Carr (1902–1951)
- Children: Alan Brown
- Parents: Herbert Edward Brown; Elizabeth (nee Beckwith) Brown

Ernest Brown (8 September 1877 – 3 January 1951), was a Scottish pioneer photographer and amateur historian whose photographs captured many important early scenes of Alberta, including the boom years (1904–1914) of Edmonton. He is regarded as one of the most important early photographers of Alberta. His archival collection, held in the Provincial Archives of Alberta, contains over 11,000 images and 50,000 negatives.

== Early life ==
Brown was born to Herbert Edward Brown, a Scottish gardener, and Elizabeth (née Beckwith) Brown in Middlesbrough on 8 September 1877. Although his family lived in Edinburgh, Scotland, Brown's mother decided she wanted to give birth close to her family in Middlesbrough. Shortly after Brown's birth, the family returned to Edinburgh.

He was educated at local schools and from a young age photography captured his imagination. In his personal writings he wrote frequently on the subject of photography, and at age seventeen announced that his ambition was to figure out colour photography. His interest in photography led him to pursue an apprenticeship with James Bacon, a portrait photographer in Newcastle upon Tyne in 1893. According to Brown, this education, although not formal, cost as much as pursuing legal or medical education at a university. Following his apprenticeship, he found work selling and producing photographs for the Shield Photo Company.

In 1902, he married Mary "Molly" Carr. Together, the couple had one son, Alan Brown.

== Life in Canada ==
Uncertain of the economic futures of England following the Boer War, Brown made the decision to immigrate to Canada in 1902, landing first in Toronto. He found it difficult to find employment, and in 1903 signed a contract to work for Charles Wesley Mathers, the first professional photographer in Edmonton. He briefly returned to England to gather Carr and the family's personal affects before travelling to Edmonton.

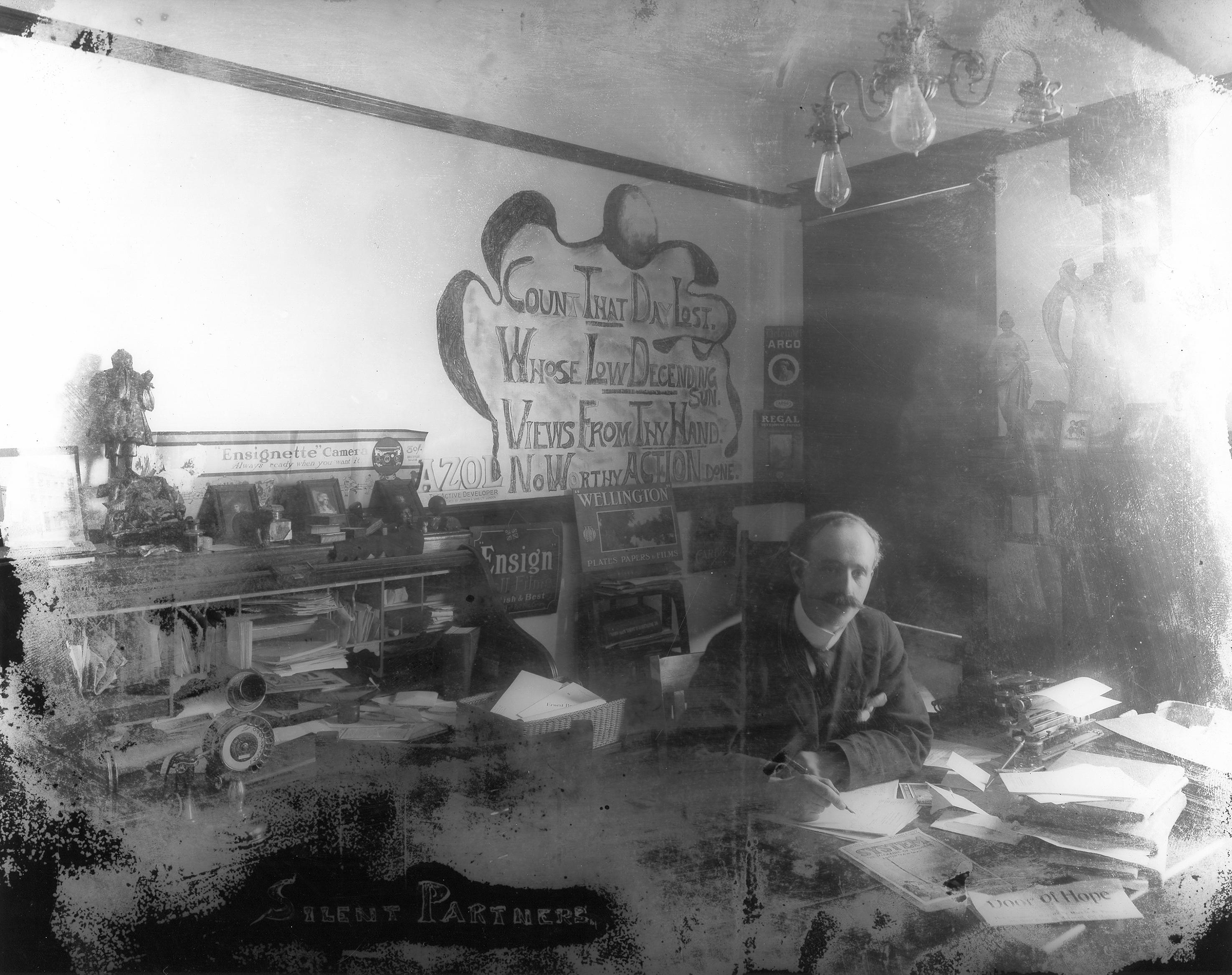
Ernest Brown in his office, Edmonton, Alberta (1910)

=== Edmonton (1904–1924) ===
Brown and Carr arrived in Edmonton on 18 April 1904. Although initially hired as an assistant, Mathers' desire to travel and photograph led him to sell his business to Brown in June 1904. The sale included Mathers' extensive collection of negatives, including collections he had purchased from other defunct photography studios. As a condition of the sale, Brown was not allowed to enter the sale of postcards and views for five years and Mathers portraits. However, Brown quickly found this agreement to be untenable as the demand for postcards was greater than portraits, and he struggled to pay the mortgage for his studio. A new agreement was reached with Mathers that allowed Brown to enter into the business of producing postcards and landscape photography.

Despite some early financial difficulties, the rapid growth of Edmonton and its naming as Alberta's capital city increased the demand for Brown's services. In 1905, he hired renowned Canadian photographer Gladys Reeves – then but seventeen years of age – as an assistant. Brown served as Reeves' mentor and the two remained close friends until Brown's death in 1951.

In addition to producing pictures, Brown also undertook work to catalogue the large collection of negatives and photographs he purchased from Mathers. This included acquiring information from individuals such as North-West Mounted Police officers, early Alberta settlers, and travellers. According to Reeves, Brown's desire to record details led him to use the cuffs of his shirts as a notepad when he had no paper on hand to record information.

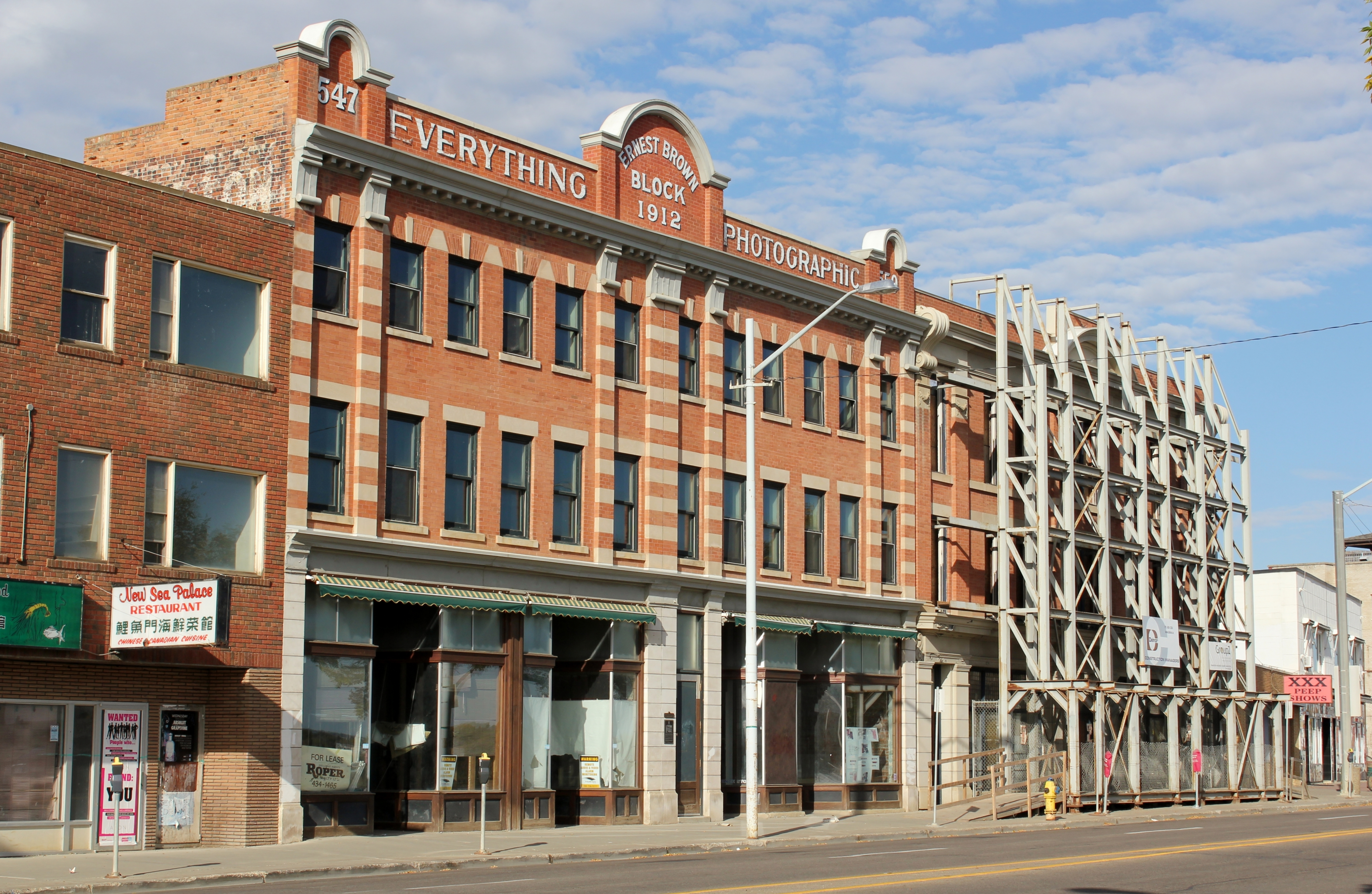
Ernest Brown Block (Brighton Block), Edmonton, Alberta (2013)

To accommodate his growing business, Brown constructed the Ernest Brown Block in 1912. The three-story brick building housed not only his studio, gallery, and picture framing businesses, but also apartments, offices, and various other businesses including a clothier and stationery store.

Although Brown's photography business initially prospered, a global economic downturn and real estate market crash in Edmonton in 1914 significantly reduced demand for his services. The outbreak of the Great War further decreased demand, and he quickly fell behind on his taxes. A steady decrease in the demand for his historical postcards and views worsened his financial state. In December 1920, a forced public auction of materials from Brown's studio was held. Several months later he was evicted from his studio and in 1923 the Ernest Brown Block were seized by the City of Edmonton.

==== Labour politics ====
Brown's financial struggles influenced him politically, and he became heavily involved in labour politics throughout the late 1910s and 1920s. In 1920 and 1921, he was elected the president of the Edmonton section of the Dominion Labor Party (Alberta), known locally as the Independent Labour Party (ILP). Although not officially a socialist party, the ILP and its members advocated for the need to dismantle capitalist industries and return businesses to public ownership. Brown himself ardently championed for banks and insurance companies to be turned into government owned institutions, with foreclosed properties being used as housing for the poor or being transformed into worker owned industries.

During the 1921 Alberta general election, Brown and former Edmonton mayor Joseph A. Clarke ran as labour candidates under the ILP in the Edmonton region. Although receiving strong support from farmers and workers, Brown and Clarke were unsuccessful in their electoral bids. Despite this electoral loss, Brown continued to speak on political matters and wrote for several labour orientated publications. In 1923, he founded his own short-lived labour newspaper, The Glow Worm, which published only three issues before folding due to financial difficulties.

=== Vegreville (1924–1929) ===
Following the seizure of Brown's businesses, he relocated to Vegreville in 1924 and purchased a small photography studio. He also dedicated extensive time to cataloguing his collection of negatives and photos. He continued to struggle financially as he found few parties interested in his extensive catalogue of historic photos. In 1926, his situation marginally improved, as the Hudson's Bay Company (HBC) ordered several photographic albums of historical photographs of HBC forts and operations. Produced with the assistance of Reeves, the project netted the pair $750 and led to a $500 contract with Canadian Pacific Railway to produce several similar albums for the company. Unfortunately, a fire on 17 February 1929 destroyed Reeves' studio, The Art League, in Edmonton where the albums were being produced.

=== Return to Edmonton (1929–1951) ===
Following the fire at Reeves' studio, Brown returned to Edmonton and opened The Goblin Studio alongside Reeves. The studio produced prints of Brown's and Reeves' work. Although finding some initial success, the onset of the Great Depression diminished demand for prints.

Conditions for Brown improved in 1933 when a local store hired him to produce a display of old photos of Edmonton and the prairie west. The display was well received, and Brown was paid by to create an expanded version of the display for the 1933 Edmonton Industrial Exhibition. The display, marketed as an opportunity to see the "Pioneer Days," was popular with residents and influenced him to create a permanent museum dedicated to the early settlement of the Canadian prairies. This museum, called The Birth of the West Museum, featured photographs, artifacts, and displays on this subject. It was accompanied by a photographic history series, compiled by Brown and Reeves, titled The Birth of the West. This series included many early photos of the Northwest Territories, Alberta, Saskatchewan, Manitoba, Indigenous Peoples, and scenes of prairie life and towns, and was primarily used as a teaching tool for schoolchildren who visited the museum.

Although The Birth of West Museum was popular, boasting over 100,000 visitors including 30,000 school children by 1939, the museum was forced to close in 1939 when the owners of Haddon Hall, the building the museum was located in, informed Brown that the Red Cross required use of the space. The Alberta government, however, promised Brown that if he found storage for his museum and photographs that they would assist in restarting the museum. To this end, the Alberta government purchased Brown's collection of museum artifacts, photographs, and negatives in 1947 for $50,000 for this purpose, although the museum was never reopened.

=== Other activities ===
Despite being of Scottish descent, Brown served as the president of the Edmonton chapter of the Sons of England Benefit Society. Meetings for the organization were often held at Brown's studio or home. In recognition of the importance of his photographic work and The Birth of the West Museum, he was named as an honorary president of the Historical Society of Alberta.

== Death and legacy ==
In November 1950, Brown suffered a severe stroke that left him bedridden. He died two months later on 3 January 1951, at the age of 73.

For his photographic and museum work, Brown was referred to locally as "Mr. History" by many city residents and newspapers during his life and for many years after his death. He has also been recognized as one of the most important photographers of the city of Edmonton, the prairie west, and Alberta.
