= Shelagh Alexander =

Canadian artist

Shelagh Hope Alexander
- Born: May 30, 1959; Winnipeg, Manitoba
- Died: November 27, 2017 (aged 59)
- Education: York University (1977-1978); Ontario College of Art (1978-1981)
- Known for: “compilation photographs” (Photomontage)
- Website: shelaghalexander.ca

Shelagh Alexander (May 30, 1959 – November 27, 2017) was a Canadian photographic artist based in Toronto, Ontario, known for her large scale “compilation photographs”.

== Career ==
After attending York University (1977-1978) and the Ontario College of Art (1978-1981), Alexander worked as the art director of Toronto's Impulse magazine, then began exhibiting what she called her “compilation photographs” that often used found film footage and found photographs as their source. One critic wrote of them that they were constructed in such a way that the narrative was disrupted and images from different sources "confronted each other in a completely other, artificial space, a space of manufacture: the space of photomontage". These photographs were directly related to cinematic construction), believed another writer.

From 1981, Alexander used her compilation photographs to tell a story. She had a number of solo exhibitions: Three Stories, Gallery 76, Toronto (1981); Hero, YYZ Artists` Outlet, Toronto (1982); Untitled, Ydessa Gallery, Toronto (1983); Untitled, Plug-In Gallery, Winnipeg (1984); Untitled, OR Gallery, Vancouver (1984); and The Somnabulst, Ydessa Gallery (1984). She also took part in the 1982 group exhibition New Canadian Photography at the Canadian Centre of Photography in Toronto. In the show, she combined words and pictures in the form of storyboards to tell a pulp parable of modern romance and urban crisis. The same year, she was part of the exhibition Monumenta, staged by artist-run centre YYZ across six venues in Toronto. In 1984, her work was included for exhibition at the 49th Parallel in NYC, New York. In 1985, her work was exhibited in the 18th Bienal de São Paulo in Brazil as well as at the Centre culturel canadien in Paris, France and at Canada House Cultural Centre Gallery in London, UK. In the same year, her compilation photographs were included in the exhibition titled Subjects and Subject Matter, curated by Elke Town for Museum London. In 1986, she exhibited in the 42nd Venice Biennale in the Aperto portion. In 1989, she took part in the National Gallery of Canada`s Canadian Biennial of Contemporary Art.

Her works are included in the collections of the Art Gallery of Hamilton, the MacKenzie Art Gallery, Regina and the National Gallery of Canada.
