= Adriene K. Veninger =

Canadian artist

Adriene K. Veninger (born 1958) is a Canadian artist. Veninger was born in Bratislava, Czechoslovakia. Veninger is known particularly for her photographic works.

Her work is included in the collections of the National Gallery of Canada and the Museum of Fine Arts Houston.
