= Helen McCall =

- Born: February 7, 1899; Toronto
- Died: 1956
- Education: Robert F.K. Brown's photography studio
- Known for: photographer

Helen McCall (February 7, 1899 – 1956) was a photographer from the Sunshine Coast, British Columbia. She is well known for her photographs of everyday life in the Gibsons region during the 1920s, 30s and 40s, and earned a living by selling her photographs as postcards to tourists and people living locally in Gibsons.

== Early life ==
Helen was born to Mercy Ellen Wilkinson in Toronto, Ontario on February 7, 1899. Early in her life, she was sent to live with her adoptive aunt and uncle, Emma and George Barnard, in Vancouver, British Columbia. There she attended a French private school, as well as one year of public school, before moving with her aunt and uncle to Thornborough Ranch, a small farm in Howe Sound, British Columbia, where she was home-schooled. In an isolated area with no siblings, Helen occupied herself with long hikes, and she worked at jobs usually meant for boys (given that she had no brothers), such as meeting the steamer by rowboat to collect the groceries.

== Photography ==
In 1916, at age seventeen, McCall apprenticed at Robert F.K. Brown's photography studio in Vancouver, where she learned silver finish photography. Later in 1916–1917, McCall worked as a clerk for photographer W.H. Calder, then worked at the Elite Studio in 1918, before returning to Howe Sound near the end of WWI.
