= Lesia Maruschak =

Canadian photographer (born 1961)

Lesia Maruschak (born 1961) is a Canadian photographer, living in Ottawa. Her work Maria about the Ukrainian famine, has been published as a book, exhibited at the National Museum of the Holodomor-Genocide in Kyiv, Ukraine and won the Grand Prix at Arsenal Book Festival there.

She was awarded the Governor General of Canada's Sovereign's Medal for Volunteers for her blood cancer charity work.

== Life and work ==
Maruschak was born in Saskatoon, Canada and is of Ukrainian descent. She received an MA in Ethnography from the University of Saskatchewan, Saskatoon and an MBA in Competitive Intelligence from the University of Ottawa, Ottawa. She lives in Ottawa.

=== Charity work ===
Maruschak has a blood cancer known as chronic lymphocytic leukemia. She was awarded the Governor General of Canada's Sovereign's Medal for Volunteers in 2013 for volunteering, fundraising and awareness raising around the topic, and for founding the non-profit organisation Cure: Blood Cancer.

=== Photography ===
Her Project Maria or Maria is based on a photograph of Maria F, a girl who survived Holodomor, the Soviet Ukrainian famine of 1932–33. Maruschak's fictional album of Maria's life "chisels out Maria's fate and portrays the relationship between the past and our time".

== Publications ==
- Maria. Charkiw-Kyiv, Ukraine: Red Zet, 2018. ISBN 978-966-97673-6-3. Edition of 200 copies.
- Transfiguration. Ottawa: Folio Efemera; Portland: Wiesedruck, 2018. ISBN 978-0-9953165-2-2. With an essay by Alison Nordström, "From Ashes".

== Awards ==
- Sovereign's Medal for Volunteers, Governor General of Canada
- Experiment category, Arsenal Book Festival, Kyiv, Ukraine, 2019 for Maria
- Grand Prix of the Contest, Arsenal Book Festival, Kyiv, Ukraine, 2019 for Maria

== Solo exhibitions ==
- Walking, Maine Media Art Gallery, Maine Media Workshops, Rockport, Maine, USA, 2018
- Project Maria, Landskrona Citadel, Landskrona Foto festival, Landskrona, Scania, Sweden, 2020; National Museum of the Holodomor-Genocide, Kyiv, Ukraine, 2020/21
