= Ruth Kaplan =

Canadian photographer

Ruth Kaplan (born 1955) is a Canadian photographer. Kaplan was born in Montreal, Quebec.

Kaplan is known for her long-term project Bathers, in which she photographed people bathing in public baths around the globe. Her work is included in the collections of the Ryerson Image Centre and the National Gallery of Canada.
