= Cluttons =

Cluttons LLP
- Company type: Private
- Industry: Chartered Surveyors
- Founded: 1765; 261 years ago
- Headquarters: Portman Street, London, UK
- Key people: James Gray, Managing partner
- Products: Residential & Commercial Property Services
- Number of employees: 250 (2022)
- Website: www.cluttons.com

Cluttons LLP is an International firm of chartered surveyors and property consultants based in Central London and operating throughout the UK. Established in 1765, Cluttons is one of the oldest established firms of Chartered Surveyors in the UK, and played an important role during the establishment of the Royal Institution of Chartered Surveyors. Cluttons is operated as a limited liability partnership with equity partners controlling the firms direction. James Gray is the current Managing Partner of Cluttons LLP.

== History ==
Cluttons traces its roots back to 1765, when William Clutton took over his father-in-law's surveying business in Sussex and began trading under his own name. One of his grandsons, John Clutton, moved to London in 1837 to found the London business. Prior to 1877, Cluttons was operating at 33 Borough High Street, in Southwark, near London Bridge. John's brothers remained in Sussex to concentrate on the land agency business, which continues today as RH & RW Clutton, an entirely separate firm.

John Clutton, born in 1809, was a joint founder and the first president of the Surveyors’ Association (later the Royal Institution of Chartered Surveyors). He died in 1896, leaving the business to his successors, including four further generations of the Clutton family.

After the Second World War, the firm opened a commercial office in Grosvenor Street, Mayfair.

The 1970s saw Cluttons expand into the Middle East. Cluttons now has representation in Abu Dhabi, Dubai, Sharjah, Bahrain and Oman.

Cluttons London Residential Agency (CLRA) was formed in 1992 by Robin Paterson after the acquisition of several Barnard Marcus London Offices and an office in Hong Kong. With funding from NatWest Ventures and Marco Polo Developments, a Singapore-based property investment company, CLRA opened new offices in London and Singapore over the next four years.

In 1997, Cluttons merged with Daniel Smith, another long-established (1775) traditional management and general practice partnership. Daniel Smith's approximately 100 partners and staff brought the total complement of the combined firm to over 500 people.

In May 2017 it was reported to have a "massive" pension fund deficit and to be submitting to a "rescue takeover". This was resolved when Cluttons was sold to RCapital.

Cluttons LLP previously had a presence in the Middle East . however this was sold to Savills back in 2018.

== Today ==
Today, Cluttons remains a private, independent business, wholly owned by the partners. The firm became a Limited Liability Partnership on 1 April 2005 and currently employs over 250 people.

== See also ==
- RH & RW Clutton
