= Sylvie Readman =

Canadian photographer

- Born: 10 August 1958; Quebec City
- Occupation: Photographer
- Employer: Université du Québec à Montréal

Sylvie Readman (born 1958 in Quebec City, Quebec) is a Canadian photographer.

Her work is included in the collections of the National Gallery of Canada and the Musée national des beaux-arts du Québec.
