= RH & RW Clutton =

Property services company in the UK

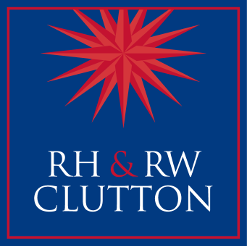
RH & RW Clutton

RH & RW Clutton is an independent firm of chartered surveyors in south-east England that can be traced back to as early at 1744. It is based in East Grinstead and has offices in Petworth and Guildford.

== History ==
RH & RW Clutton was originally founded back in 1765, when William Clutton took over his father-in-law's surveying business in Sussex and began trading under his own name. He had a son, also named William, who had five sons - Robert, Ralph, John, Henry and William.

One of those grandsons, John Clutton, moved to London in 1837 to found the London business which today trades as Cluttons. John's brothers remained in Sussex to concentrate on the land agency business, which continues today as RH & RW Clutton.

== Today ==
The company has been managing rural estates since 1743 and is one of the oldest property firms in the world and the oldest land management firm in the United Kingdom. It retains some of its original clients, and has acted for some families over many generations. The firm is regulated by the Royal Institution of Chartered Surveyors.

== See also ==
- Cluttons
