= Gladys Reeves =

Canadian photographer

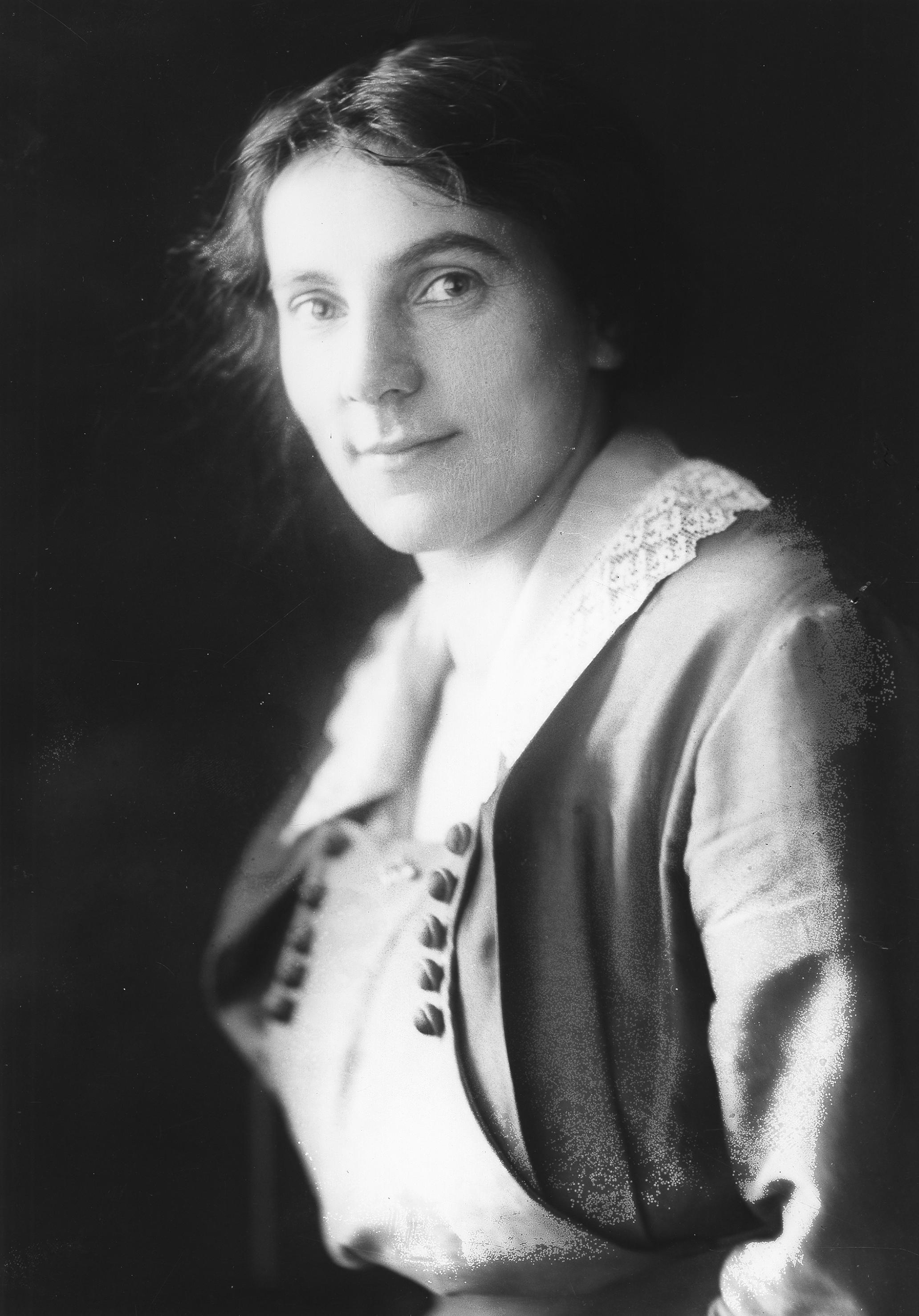
- Gladys Reeves ca. 1920.
- Born: 1890; Somerset, United Kingdom
- Died: 26 April 1974 (aged 83–84); Edmonton, Canada
- Known for: Photography

Gladys Reeves (1890–1974), was an Edmonton, Alberta photographer, establishing a photographic studio in 1920 and staying in the business until 1950.

== Biography ==
Gladys Reeves was born in 1890 in Somerset, England. She and her family emigrated to Edmonton, Canada in 1904.

In 1905, she started her career in photography working as a receptionist for the photographer Ernest Brown. Brown helped Reeves start her own studio named The Art League in 1920. This was the first woman-owned photographic studio in Canada west of Winnipeg. The studio specialized in portraits and commercial photography.

In 1929, Reeves' first studio was destroyed by fire, but reopened at a new location on Jasper Avenue.

Reeves and Brown opened the Pioneer Days Museum in the 1930s.

Concurrent with her success as a photographer, Reeves was involved with the beautification of Edmonton. She belonged to the Edmonton Horticultural Society where she served a term as President; the first woman to hold that office. She was a charter member of the Edmonton Tree Planting Committee. In 1923, the Edmonton Tree Planting Committee coordinated the planting of more than 5,000 trees on boulevards in Edmonton.

Reeves died in Edmonton on 26 April 1974 at the age of 83.

Her works were included in a 1983 exhibition entitled "Rediscovery: Canadian Women Photographers 1841–1941".

A collection of Reeves' photographs is in the Provincial Archives of Alberta.
