= Jean Gainfort Merrill =

Canadian photographer (born 1913)

Jean Gainfort Merrill (born 1913) was a Canadian photographer. She was the first woman to become a member of the Canadian Press Photographers' Union.

Born in Norwich, Ontario, she began working as an apprentice for photographer Alma Clutton shortly after she finished high school. She worked in the darkroom for three years before she was allowed to take photographs. Some years later, she began taking courses at a Photographer's Association of America school in Winona Lake, Indiana. She returned to Norwich for a year and then, in 1937, she moved to Toronto. There she worked first for Sylvia Schwartz and then, in 1940, for news photographer Herb Nott. Nott joined the military in 1942 and Merill was left in charge of the studio. On Nott's return, Merrill became his partner in the studio. She later worked for the Stills Division of the National Film Board of Canada. Her photographs appeared in various newspapers including The Globe and Mail. In 1948, she received an award from the Commercial and Press Photographers Association of Canada.
