= Clutton-Brock =

Clutton-Brock is a surname, and may refer to:

- Alan Clutton-Brock (1904–1976), English art critic and essayist
- Arthur Clutton-Brock (1868–1924), English essayist, critic and journalist
- Guy Clutton-Brock (1906–1995), English social worker who became a Zimbabwean nationalist
- Juliet Clutton-Brock (1933–2015), English zooarchaeologist and curator
- Molly Clutton-Brock (1912–2013), British therapist and youth worker
- Tim Clutton-Brock, British zoologist

The family name originated in the adoption of the additional surname of 'Brock' by Thomas Clutton, J.P., D.L., of Pensax Court, Worcestershire, in 1809, as per a stipulation in the will of his maternal great-uncle, Thomas Brock, of Chester, Cheshire, in which county the Clutton family had been resident since the reign of Henry III.
