= Alma Clutton =

Canadian photographer

Alma Clutton (1875–10 October 1955) was a Canadian photographer known for being the only woman in Norwich, Ontario to run her own photography business and studio. She was a family and portrait photographer and gained recognition for her child and infant portraits. Clutton also mentored and inspired other young women in photography, traveled to Europe and North Africa, and co-founded the Norwich Pioneers Museum in her 82 years of life.

== Early life ==
Clutton was born in Norwich, Ontario, 1 October 1875,to Anna Jane Moore and Johnathan Lamb Clutton. Her father was an obsessive drinker, and her mother did not want her children to be raised in an alcoholic household. Clutton's father eventually moved to Detroit to become a furniture salesmen. Clutton had a brother named Ernest, who owned a tobacco and soybean farm.

== Education ==
Clutton moved to Detroit to study photography in the late 1800s with F.W. Schaldenbrad. After graduating, she moved back to Norwich and took over a photography business from a retired man. Clutton received all of the previous business owner's supplies, including glass negatives and a camera. Her business was successful and she gained popularity in Norwich for her portraits of children and infants.

== Mentorship ==
Clutton became a mentor to Jean Gainfort Merrill. Once Merrill graduated from high school, Clutton took her in as an apprentice. In Clutton's studio, Merrill trained in the darkroom and learned about developing and retouching photos for three years. By the fourth year, Merrill had worked her way into taking portrait photos for Clutton. Merrill went on to open her own studio in Toronto. She also joined the Canadian Press Photographers and became their first female member.

== Norwich Pioneers Museum ==
Clutton co-founded the Norwich Pioneers Museum with the help of Stella Mott, the town's high school teacher. They collected items from people that they thought should be saved, and put them in the museum. The Norwich Pioneers Museum is still there today and has been renamed to the Norwich and District Archives. It carries an abundance of history and information about the small town from its foundation to the present day.

== Travels ==
In 1921, Clutton put her studio on hold to travel to Europe and Egypt. She traveled alone for most of her journey and visited her relatives in southern France for a part of her trip. She photographed her travels and began to take an interest in antiques and traditional crafts.

== Death ==
Clutton died on October 10, 1955, aged 82. After her death, her brother Ernest sold her camera. Clutton's photographs can still be found in the Norwich and District Archives Museum.

== Influence ==
Clutton was a hardworking business woman who became successful during a time when women did not become professionals. Not only was she successful, but she was also willing to share her talent and knowledge of photography with other young women. Clutton encouraged and taught more women to practice photography and pursue photography as a career. She created a path for other women to unapologetically share their love of photography with confidence and courage.
