= Claire Beaugrand-Champagne =

Canadian documentary photographer

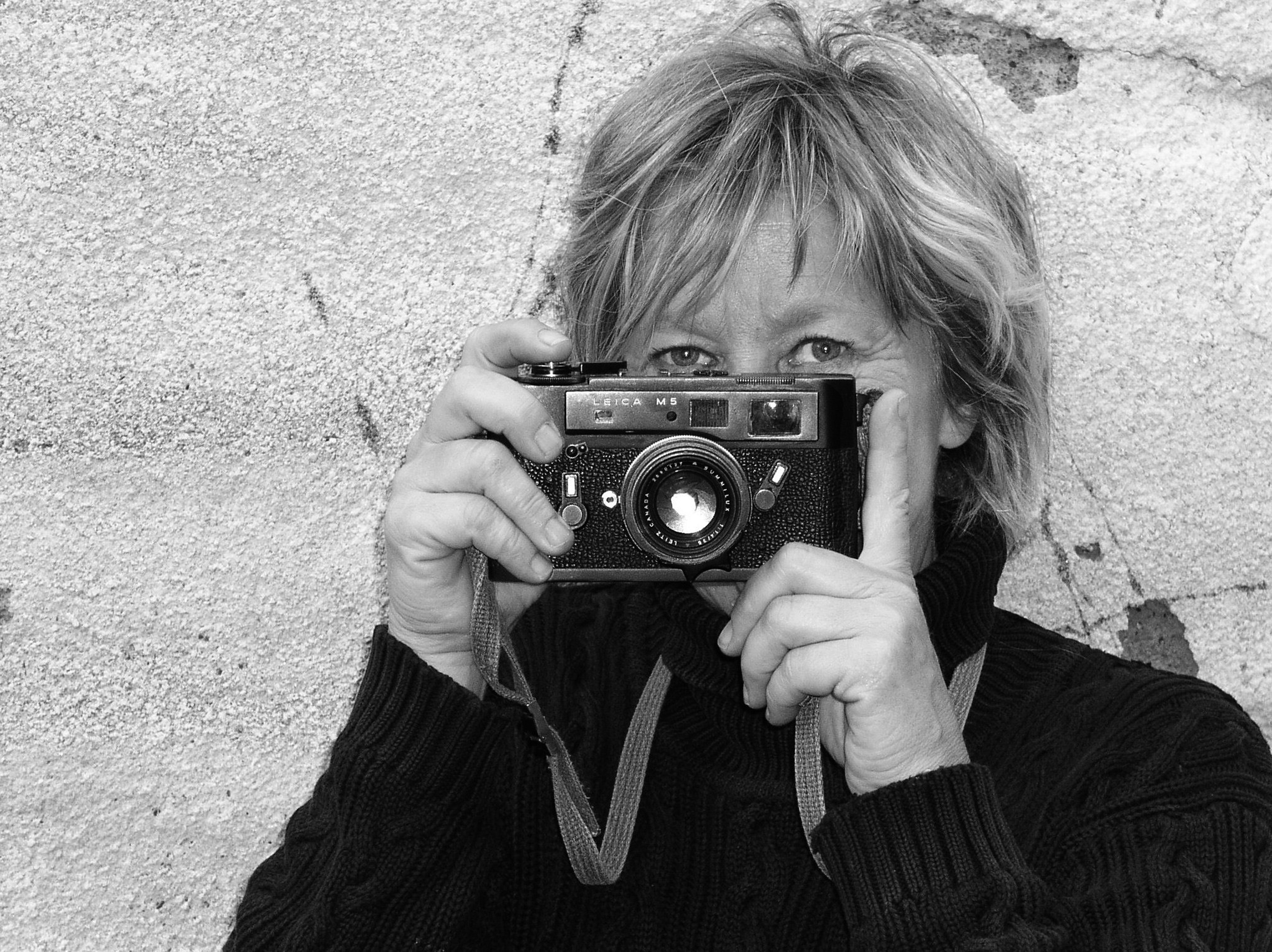
- Born: 1948 (age 77–78); Montreal, Quebec
- Known for: photography
- Website: http://www.clairebeaugrandchampagne.ca

Claire Beaugrand-Champagne (born 1948) is a Canadian documentary photographer. She is known for her socially engaged work and, having started her career in 1970, is considered the first female press photographer in Quebec. She was a member of the Groupe d'action photographique (GAP) alongside Michel Campeau, Gabor Szilasi, Roger Charbonneau et Pierre Gaudard

Beaugrand-Champagne's is known for her work documenting Quebec society, including contributing to Disraeli, une expérience humaine en photographie (1972-1974). Created alongside fellow GAP member Michel Campeau, the project showcases daily life in the province's rural societies. The artist has taken a similar approach with solo projects. Her work Thien & Hung (1980 -1995), Beaugrand-Champagne photographer a refugee couple over fifteen years of their adjustment to life in Canada. Issues related to refugees in Canada, including housing and discrimination, have become a focus of her contemporary work.

Her photographs are part of several museum collections including: National Gallery of Canada, Musée national des beaux-arts du Québec, Musée d'art contemporain de Montréal, Library and Archives Canada and McCord Museum.

She trained at the Collège Marguerite-Bourgeoys, Marylebone Institute and the CEGEP du Vieux-Montréal

== Major exhibitions ==
- Claire Beaugrand-Champagne. Émouvante Vérité. Photographies de 1970 à 2013, McCord Museum, Montreal, December 2013 - April 2014
- La photographie d'auteur au Québec - Une collection prend forme au musée, Montreal Museum of Fine Arts, Montreal, July 2013 - December 2013
- Femmes artistes. L'éclatement des frontières, 1965-2000. Musée national des beaux-arts du Québec, Québec, June 2010 - October 2010
- Déclics. Art et Société. Le Québec des années 60 et 70. Musée d'art contemporain de Montréal, Montreal and Musée de la civilisation, Québec, May 1999 - October 1999
- Esthétiques actuelles de la photographie au Québec, Rencontres d'Arles, Arles, July 1982 and Musée d'art contemporain de Montréal, Montreal, December 1982 - January 1983

== Bibliography ==
- Pierre, Landry. Le documentaire et au-delà, Femmes artistes du XXe siècle au Québec. collection Arts du Québec, Musée national des beaux-arts du Québec, 2010
- Claire Beaugrand-Champagne. Des gens de mon quartier, Les Éditions Libre Expression, 2004
- Photography in Canada, 1839 - 1989: An Illustrated History by Sarah Bassnett and Sarah Parsons from the Art Canada Institute.
- Sandra Grant-Marchand. Esthétiques actuelles de la photographie au Québec : Onze photographes. Musée d'art contemporain de Montréal, 1982
