= Martin Knottenbelt =

Dutch activist

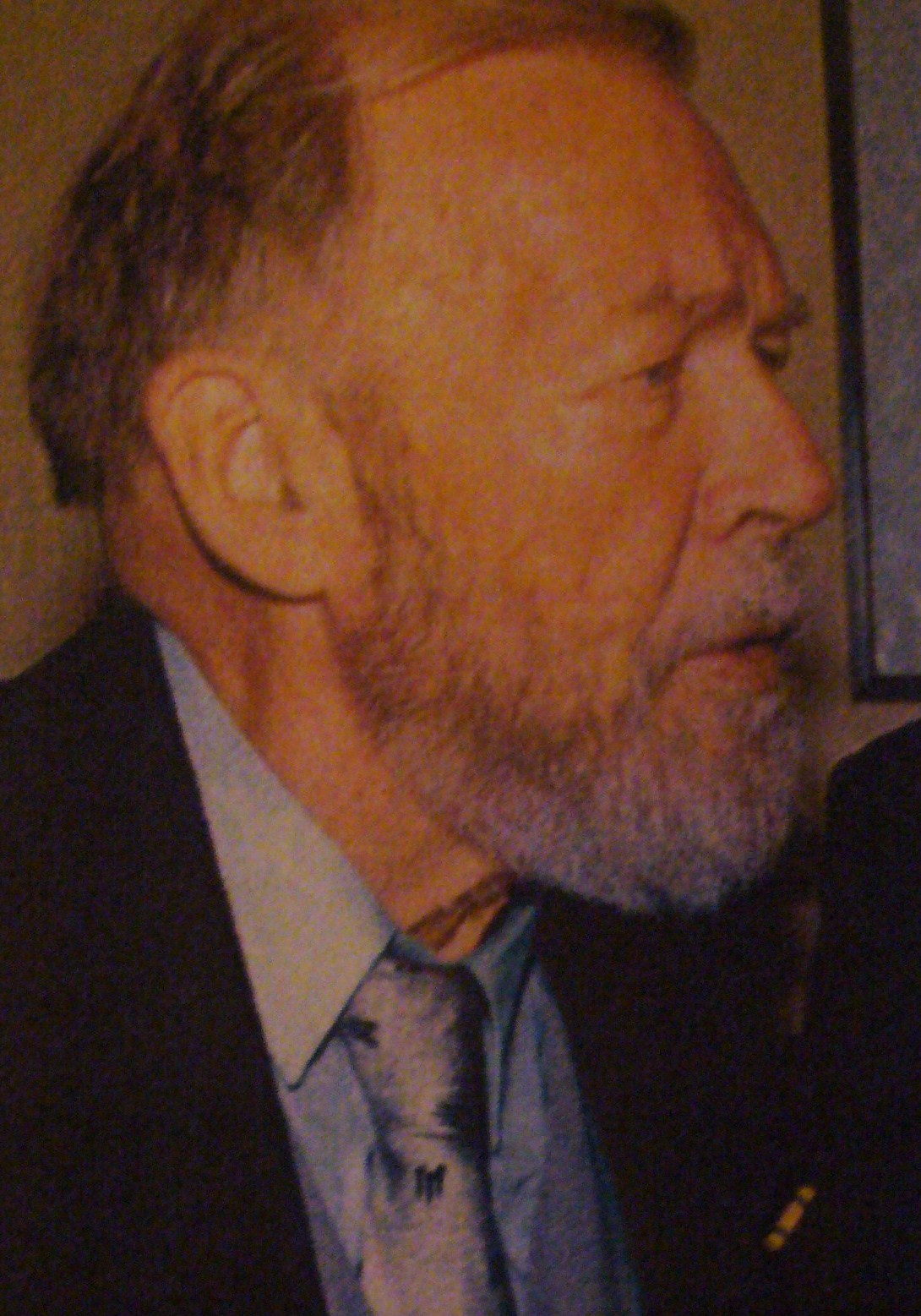
Martin Knottenbelt in 2003

Martin (Maarten Jan) Knottenbelt (12 March 1920, Batavia, Dutch East Indies – 19 August 2004, The Hague) was a Dutch citizen studying at the University of Oxford in England when World War II began. Knottenbelt enlisted in 1942 and served in a Dutch commando unit in Europe and the Pacific until he was relieved from his post in 1946. Knottenbelt was honorably discharged in 1960 from military service, and went on to become an anti-war activist, primarily in Europe and the United States.
