= Joanne Jackson Johnson =

Canadian photographer (born 1943)

- Born: October 17, 1943 (age 82); Winnipeg, Manitoba
- Education: B.S. from University of Manitoba (1965); MFA from University of Minnesota (1972)
- Occupation: Photographer

Joanne Jackson Johnson (born 1943) is a Canadian photographer.

== Early life and education ==
Johnson was born on October 17, 1943, in Winnipeg, Manitoba. In 1965, Johnson received a BS from the University of Manitoba. In 1972, Johnson received an MFA in Film and Photography from the University of Minnesota.

== Career and photographs ==
Johnson was a founding member of the Winnipeg Film Group and has served on its board since its founding in 1974. From 1974 to 1977, Johnson worked for the National Film Board of Canada and commercial companies doing freelance film work. Since 1977, Johnson has been an assistant professor of photography at the School of Art at the University of Manitoba. Johnson's photographs are held in collections at the National Gallery of Canada and Winnipeg Art Gallery.

== Selected exhibitions ==
- Photographs: Clayton Bailey, Joanne Jackson Johnson, David McMillan, Three-person Exhibition; Winnipeg Art Gallery; Winnipeg, Manitoba (1977)
- Joanne Jackson Johnson: Colour Photographs, Arthur Street Gallery (Plug In Inc.); Winnipeg, Manitoba (1980)
- Midstream in Mainstreet: New Photographs [Joanne Jackson Johnson], Solo Exhibition; Plug in Inc.; Winnipeg, Manitoba (1983)
- Joanne Jackson Johnson: Metaphors Metamorphs & Just Pictures, Gallery 1.1.1.; School of Art, University of Manitoba; Winnipeg, Manitoba (1984)
- Joanne Jackson Johnson [Lecture], Public Lecture; Floating Gallery; Winnipeg, Manitoba (1984)
- Arts Manitoba: Issue 12 [Joanne Jackson Johnson] is published, Border Crossings; Winnipeg, Manitoba (1984)
