= Mia Matthes =

Canadian photographer (1920–2010)

- Born: Mariette Gauthier; 1920; Montreal
- Died: November 26, 2010 (aged 89–90)
- Known for: Photography
- Spouse: Klaus Matthes
- Awards: National Order of Quebec

Mia Matthes (1920 – November 26, 2010) was a Canadian photographer in Quebec. Her name also appears as simply Mia or as Mariette Poulin.

== Life ==
She was born Mariette Gauthier in Montreal. In 1952, she married Klaus Matthes, a German immigrant. Matthes and her husband began to photograph rural and urban landscapes in Canada under the name "Mia and Klaus". They founded a commercial studio in Montreal in 1958. The couple published several books of their work and their photographs were featured at Expo 86. She also taught fashion design at the École ménagère provincial de Montréal. Mia Matthes was a photographer, illustrator, author and mother of four. Mia captured breath taking photographs of the architecture and landscapes of Quebec and other parts of the world. Mia and Klaus teamed up to create photography that many say are captured with impressive skill and romantic charm. The techniques of color and light used to capture landscapes around Canada and the World have been enjoyed by many who admire the works of Mia and Klaus. Along with taken breath taking photographs Mia attached quotes of poetry some by Gatien Lapointe to the descriptions that magnified the photographs. One of their most celebrated collection was of Quebec. Mia was the president of Quebec Provincial Photographers Association. Not too long after Mia and Klaus were named Chevaliers, Klaus died in 1999 and Mia continued photography mostly books until she died in 2010. Prior to her death she completed what would be her last book which is a collection of work of her life and beauty she captured of the world spanning 50 years.

Mia Matthes had five children: Jaques Poulin, Johanne Poulin Gagnon, François Poulin (Barbara), Chantal Poulin (Luc Chartrand) and Stephan Poulin.

She died in Montreal after a long illness at the age of 90.

== Work ==
Some of Mia Matthes' most famous works are, "Mia and Klaus - Wide Landscapes of Quebec", "Quebec" 1981, "Dieu", "The St. Lawrence" and many more. Mia collaborated with a number of institutions such as, "the National Film Board of Canada and the Ministry of Canadian Foreign Affairs." At one point, there were stamps featuring photographs of the works of Mia and Klaus on Canada stamps. Some of her photographs were published in magazines around the world such as in France and Germany.

In 1998, Matthes and her husband were named Chevaliers in the National Order of Quebec.
