= Léone Boudreau-Nelson =

Canadian phonetician (1915 - 2004)

Léone Boudreau-Nelson

Léone Boudreau-Nelson, C.M, (December 9, 1915 – April 26, 2004) was an American-born Canadian phonetician. She founded the Société d'art oratoire at the Université de Moncton, where she was professeur émérite.

== Biography ==
Léone Boudreau-Nelson was born in Somerville, Massachusetts, December 9, 1915 to Acadian parents. She was a professor of French phonetics at the Université de Moncton, where she founded the Société d'art oratoire. She promoted closer ties between Acadia, France and Louisiana, was an active contributor to the Société historique acadienne, and was the founder of the Association France-Canada.

== Death and legacy ==
Léone Boudreau-Nelson died on April 26, 2004. Her documents are held by the Centre d'études acadiennes Anselme-Chiasson at Université de Moncton.

== Awards and honours ==
- 1990, Member, Order of Canada
- 2002, Queen Elizabeth II Golden Jubilee Medal
