= Nadya Kwandibens =

Anishinaabe photographer

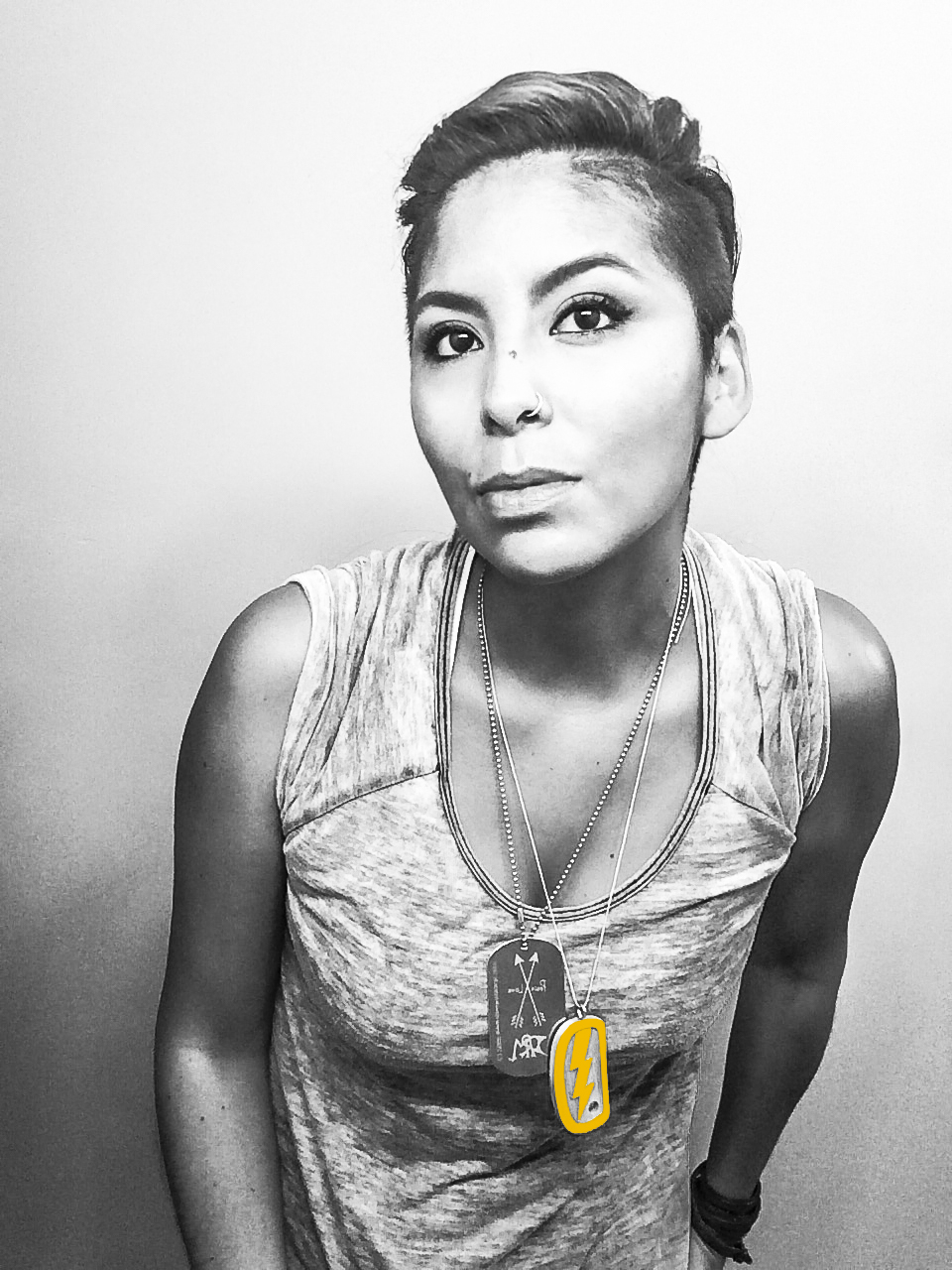
- Education: Confederation College
- Website: www.redworks.ca

Nadya Kwandibens is an Anishinaabe (Ojibwe) photographer specializing in natural light portraiture, event, and concert photography. Her work documents the indigenous experience. In 2023, she was appointed Toronto's photo laureate.

== Early life and education ==
Kwandibens is from Animakee Wa Zhing 37 First Nation in northwestern Ontario. She grew up in foster care.

In 2000, Kwandibens studied film production at Confederation College. She studied photography as a course requirement and maintained it as a hobby. She is largely self-taught. She began working for CBC Radio and studied English literature before moving to Arizona in 2005.

== Life and work ==
While in Arizona, she began booking portrait sessions and began focusing professionally on photography. Kwandibens' decision to focus on photography was based wanting to portray Indigenous people accurately. She has traveled throughout the United States and Canada to photograph Indigenous people and communities.

In 2008, Kwandibens founded Red Works Photography to positively portray Indigenous peoples. In 2012 and 2013, she documented the Idle No More movement. In 2019, Kwandibens worked on a campaign with the National Inquiry into Missing and Murdered Indigenous Women, photographing people who had lost a family member or friend. This series, Sacred MMIWG, was funded by the Canadian government. In 2020, she signed with Canon Inc. as a brand ambassador. In 2023, Kwandibens was appointed to a three-year term as Toronto's photo laureate. She also teaches workshops for youth, university students, and community groups.

Kwandibens finds subjects through open calls and aims to photograph them in locations where they feel comfortable. Her work challenges the "stoic Indian" stereotype and often features women. Kwandibens' first series, "Concrete Indians", focused on contemporary Indigenous identity and decolonization. The series includes portraits of her subjects in full or partial traditional dress within urban settings. Her second series, "Red Works Outtakes", endeavored to combat the "stoic Indian" stereotype. She applied improvisational techniques in order to capture images of Indigenous people in high spirits. Her series "Red Chair Sessions" photographed subjects in their chosen locations standing beside or sitting in a red chair, representing Indigenous bloodlines and connection to the land they are from.

== Awards ==
- 2023–2026: Toronto photo laureate
- 2018: Ontario Arts Council Indigenous Arts Award
