= Violet Keene =

English–Canadian photographer (1893–1987)

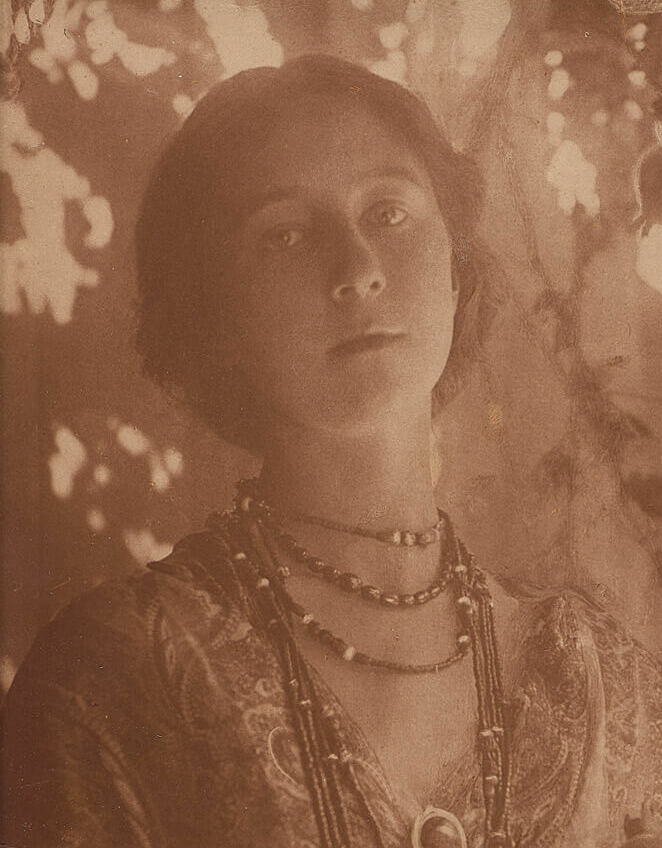
- Keene, photographed c. 1910 by her mother
- Born: 1893; Bath, Somerset, England; UK of Great Britain and Ireland
- Died: 10 May 1987 (aged 93–94); Oakville, Ontario, Canada
- Occupation: Photographer
- Spouse: Harold Edgar Perinchief
- Mother: Minna Keene

Violet Keene (1893 – 10 May 1987) was an English-born Canadian photographer.

== Personal life ==
In 1893, Violet Keene was born in Bath, Somerset, England, to the photographer Minna Keene. The family later moved to Canada, residing in Montreal and then Toronto. Keene married Harold Edgar Perinchief and retained her maiden name. She died in Oakville, Ontario, on 10 May 1987.

== Career ==
Keene first learned photography in her mother's Montreal studio. She assisted her mother with a 1914–1915 commission by Canadian Pacific Railway to photograph the Rocky Mountains for marketing materials. After her mother's 1943 death, Keene took over her studios in Oakville and Montreal.

Violet Keene exhibited her work in both Europe and North America. In Toronto, she established her own studio where she photographed Canadian artists and statesmen such as Aldous Huxley, George Bernard Shaw, and Vere Ponsonby, 9th Earl of Bessborough.

Art Canada Institute described Keene's work as "neglected for many years" before rediscovery was driven by a 1983 exhibition displayed at Art Gallery of Ontario and London Regional Art Gallery. The archives of her work (and her mother's) were acquired by The Image Centre at Toronto Metropolitan University.
