= Erin Combs =

Illinois-born Canadian photographer (b. 1952/53)

Erin Combs (born 1952), also known as Erin Combs Pearl, is a photographer who worked at the Toronto Star. Hired as a photojournalist in 1974, she was one of the first women photographers to contribute regularly to a major Canadian newspaper.

== Early life and education ==
Born in Illinois, Erin Combs moved to Canada when she was three years old.

She was photographed for a girls' fashion story in The Globe and Mail in 1964. In high school, she was a photographer for the school's yearbook. In college she contributed photos to the college newspaper.

She attended York University in Toronto, Ontario.

== Career ==
Combs worked as a freelance photographer while she was a university student in the early 1970s, at a time when no women photographers worked at major Canadian newspapers.

In 1974, the Toronto Star hired 22-year-old Combs as a photographer, where she became known as "Shorty" as she stood 5 ft 2 in (1.57 m). She worked as a photographer in the fashion section, as a photo editor and as Head of Photography Department (1992 to 2000). During her time at the newspaper, Combs also judged photo contests and won the Judy award for journalistic coverage of the fashion sector (an award shared with the Toronto Star fashion team).

Toronto Star photographer Dick Loek, reflecting on Combs's tenure at the newspaper, wrote that her father had said "if she got hired to watch out, because she would be running the joint in no time". Loek added that those words "turned out to be a pretty accurate prophecy".

From 2001 to 2004, Combs worked in public relations and marketing for clothiers Zenobia Collections.
