= Aline Gubbay =

Canadian photographer, art historian and writer

- Born: June 20, 1920; Alexandria, Egypt
- Died: October 21, 2005 (aged 85); Montreal, Canada
- Known for: Photographer, Writer
- Spouse: Eric Gubbay (m. 1948–1994)

Aline Gubbay (June 20, 1920 – October 21, 2005) was a Canadian photographer, art historian and writer.

Gubbay was the author of four non-fiction books, Montreal's Little Mountain (1979), The Mountain and the River (1981), A Street Called the Main (1989) and A View of Their Own (1998).

== Biography ==
Born in Alexandria, Egypt on June 20, 1920, Gubbay was the daughter of a Turkish mother and a Russian Jewish father From Georgia. In 1924, at the age of four, Gubbay moved with her family to England.

Despite earning a scholarship to the Royal Academy of Dramatic Art in London in 1935, Gubbay pursued a career in photography at the urging of her parents. She studied with photographer Germaine Kahn and had a successful career as a portrait photographer in England. Notably, her photograph of Charles de Gaulle was used on a Free France propaganda leaflet.

In 1948, she married Eric Gubbay and they emigrated to Winnipeg. At that time Gubbay abandoned her photography career. In 1956, with her children grown, the Gubbays moved to Montreal and Aline returned to her education, obtaining a degree from McGill University in social work. In 1978, she received her master's degree in art history from Concordia University.

Gubbay wrote for the Westmount Examiner on the topic of local history. She was the author of four non-fiction books, Montreal's Little Mountain (1979), The Mountain and the River (1981), A Street Called the Main (1989), and A View of Their Own (1998).

In 2005, Gubbay died of pancreatic cancer in Montreal.

== Publications ==
- Montreal's Little Mountain =: La Petite Montagne: a Portrait of: un Portrait de Westmount. Westmount: Trillium, 1979. Photographs by Gubbay, maps by Sally Hooff. ISBN 978-0969015901. Translated by Rachel Levy. Text in English and French.
- Montréal's Little Mountain: a Portrait of Westmount. Montreal: Optimum, 1985. ISBN 9780888901750. Text in English and French.
- Montréal: le Fleuve et la Montagne; the Mountain and the River. Montreal: Trillium, 1981. Text and photographs by Gubbay. ISBN 9780969015918. Text in English and French.
- A Street Called the Main: the Story of Montreal's Boulevard Saint-Laurent. Montreal: Meridian, 1989. ISBN 9780929058078.
- A View of Their Own: The Story Of Westmount. Montreal: Price-Patterson, 1998. ISBN 9781896881102.
