= Edith Maybin =

Canadian photographer

Edith Maybin (born 1969) is a Canadian photographer.

Maybin was born in Oshawa, Ontario. In 2006, she received an MA degree from the Swansea Institute of Art.

Maybin's work is included in the collections of the National Gallery of Canada and the National Portrait Gallery, London.
