= Barbara Spohr =

Canadian photographer

Barbara Spohr (1955–1987) was a Canadian photographer.

== Career ==
Spohr was born in Vancouver, British Columbia. From 1973 to 1974 she attended the Alberta College of Art and from 1974 to 1978, the Banff School of Fine Arts where she took sculptural weaving with Gyöngy Laky, painting and printmaking with Douglas Morton, Takao Tanabe, and Stephen Andrews and photography with Alison Rossiter. In 1979, she taught, and was artist-in-residence for one year at the Apeiron Photo Workshop in Millerton, NY. From this time on, photography was her art form.

In 1980, Spohr and nine other prominent Alberta artists were invited by Douglas Clark, Curator of Photography at the Edmonton Art Gallery to participate in A Photographic Project: Alberta 1980, and to document selected rural and urban communities. Spohr was assigned to Paddle Prairie, a Métis settlement in northern Alberta. In 1981, Spohr moved to Nelson, British Columbia where she continued with her own photography; from 1982 to 1983, she was as well assistant curator at the David Thompson University Centre's MacGregor Gallery. In 1983, she took a writing course at Selkirk College, Castlegar, BC, and did finish-line photography for horse racing associations.

During this time she also worked on her "Nelson Portrait" series, photographing the town, its people and flowers from unusual angles. Intrigued by the life and diaries of Frieda Hume Bottons, an early 20th century Nelson resident, Spohr incorporated excerpts from Bottons' diaries in the borders of many of the photos. Around 1985, Spohr began creating printed borders for her photographs, using patterns. During this period, Spohr also made a whimsical series of feet self-portraits. In Spohr's last untitled and undated series of works, she created a wide range of images and enclosed the photos with painted borders of textured brushwork.

Spohr began showing her work in the late 1970s in Montreal, then continued, often in photography galleries. Her work is included in the collections of the Getty Museum the National Gallery of Canada, the Banff Centre Collection, and the Art Gallery of Alberta. In 1987, after a life-long battle with Hodgkin's disease, Spohr died at the age of thirty-two Calgary, Alberta.

After her death, there were memorial exhibitions of her work in Calgary (1987); Edmonton (1992), and Banff (1993, 2008). Every two years the Walter Phillips Gallery awards the Barbara Spohr Memorial Award to a recent Banff Centre Visual Arts residency alumni. Created by the family and friends of the late artist Barbara Spohr, this award is intended to encourage the development of Canadian contemporary photography by providing financial and creative assistance to an artist whose work has made a significant contribution to the field.
