= Tess Boudreau =

Canadian photographer

- Born: Therese Boudreau; 1919; Nova Scotia
- Died: 2007 (aged 87–88)
- Spouse: Kryn Taconis

Tess Boudreau, also known as Tess Boudreau-Taconis (1919–2007), was a Canadian photographer. Boudreau was known for her documentary photography and portraits of other artists.

== Career ==
Tess Boudreau was born in Nova Scotia, and lived there and in Montreal, and Paris. In Paris, she worked for Henri Cartier-Bresson as a caption writer for his photographs. She was a professional darkroom technician. In 1950, she met her husband, Kryn Taconis, who also had affiliations with Cartier-Bresson through Magnum Photo. The couple eventually left Paris for Amsterdam, and then moved to Toronto where Boudreau worked as a photographer in the arts community during the 1960s. She recorded the faces of Canadian culture.

Her work is included in the collections of the National Gallery of Canada and the Art Gallery of Ontario (AGO). Her negatives and contact sheets form one of the AGO Library's Special Collections.

Tess Boudreau died in 2007 in Guelph, Ontario.

== Legacy ==
after her death, her negatives and contact sheets were given to the Art Gallery of Ontario in Toronto where they received conservation.

In 2016, her work was included in the exhibition Form Follows Fiction: Art and Artists in Toronto curated by Luis Jacob for the Justina M. Barnicke Gallery at the University of Toronto Art Centre.
