= Mary Spencer (photographer) =

Canadian photographer (1857–1938)

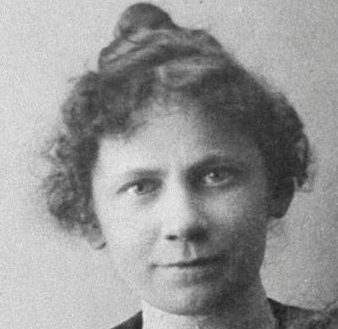
- Mary Spencer in the 1900s
- Born: October 4, 1857; St. Catharines, Ontario
- Died: September 1, 1938 (aged 80); Summerland, British Columbia
- Known for: Photography

Mary Spencer (1857–1938) was a Canadian photographer.

== Education ==
Margaret Spencer was born on October 4, 1857, in St. Catharines, Ontario, the daughter of Margaret and Abraham Spencer. Spencer began her schooling at St. George's and later St. Catherine's Collegiate Institute, before she studied for a teaching degree at Lincoln County Model School beginning in 1877. Her first position as a teacher after gaining her certification was at School Section Number One, Port Severn, in 1878. Spencer enrolled in the Toronto Normal School in January 1879 to gain further credentials, gaining a second-class teaching certificate in June 1879. She gained another teaching position after the family relocated to Port Colborne in 1880.

== Photographic career ==
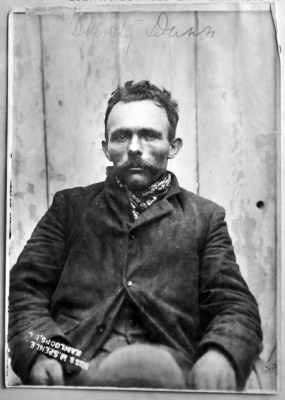
Shorty Dunn – photograph by Mary Spencer

During her time in Port Colborne, Spencer developed her skills in oil painting and had also taken up photography. She and her mother Margaret and sister Isobel relocated to Kamloops, British Columbia, in 1898, and she quickly established a photography studio. Spencer opened her photography studio in Kamloops on June 25, 1899, also offering oil painting classes. In 1903, she bought property at 218 Victoria Street and hired an architect to construct a new studio with living quarters above. Her portraits became popular amongst Kamloops notables and many of her scenic images of the Kamloops area were made into postcards and souvenir books.

In May 1906, Spencer was hired by the Vancouver Daily Province to cover the capture and trial of train bandit Bill Miner and his gang, increasing her reputation as a photojournalist. She managed to obtain a series of images of the capture of the gang, even being allowed to photograph the gang during initial questioning and in the courtroom. Her mug shots of Bill Miner, William "Shorty" Dunn, and Louis Colquhuon were published in the local newspaper, the Kamloops Standard. In 1906 Spencer and her sister Isobel purchase an orchard in Summerland, British Columbia, and moved there three years later. In 1909, she sold the photography business to Mrs. L. M. Walker and moved to Summerland to run the orchard with her sister.

It is unclear whether Spencer re-established a full photography studio in Summerland, as photographs from that era evidence more family oriented topics, but she continued her artistic endeavors by painting china, was active in the Baptist Church community, and assisted Isobel with cultivating their orchard. Mary Spencer died of pneumonia on September 1, 1938, in the West Summerland hospital.
