= Marianna Knottenbelt =

Dutch-Canadian artist

Marianna Knottenbelt (born 1949) is a Dutch-Canadian artist, architect and real-estate developer.

== Early life and education ==
Knottenbelt was born in the city of Hilversum in the Netherlands in 1949. Her mother was a sculptor, while her father worked in business. When she was two and a half, her family moved to Montreal, Canada, which is where she attended high school at Weston High School. She received her undergraduate degree from Smith College in Northampton, Massachusetts where she studied art history and French. She earned her graduate degree at Harvard University in their School of Design.

== Photography career ==
Her work is included in the collections of the National Gallery of Canada and the International Center of Photography.

In 1976, Knottenbelt had her work featured in an exhibit entitled Destination: Europe at Optica Gallery. Other artists that were part of the exhibit included Pierre Boogaerts, Robert Bordeau, Lynne Cohen, Charles Gagnon, Tom Gibson, and Vincent Sharp.

== Land development ==
Knottenbelt is a registered architect. She moved to the Hawaiian island of Maui around 1983 and became involved with land development for residential construction. She has worked for several real-estate companies in the area including Maui Architectural Group, Bello McCormack Realty, and Coldwell Banker McCormack Real Estates.
