= Diane Borsato =

Canadian visual artist

Diane Borsato (born December 1973) is a Canadian visual artist whose work explores pedagogical practices and experiential ways of knowing through performance, intervention, video, installation, and photography. Her multidisciplinary and socially engaged works are often created through the mobilization of distinct groups of people including arts professionals, artists, and naturalists. Her work has been widely exhibited in galleries, museums and artist-run-centres across Canada and internationally, including the Vancouver Art Gallery, Power Plant Contemporary Art Gallery, The Art Gallery of York University, the National Museum of Fine Arts of Quebec, Art Metropole, Mercer Union, the Musée d'Art Contemporain in Montreal, and in galleries in the US, France, Germany, Mexico, Taiwan and Japan. Borsato was a Sobey Art Award nominee in 2011 and 2013 and the recipient of the Victor Martyn Lynch-Staunton Award in 2008 for her research and practices in the Inter-Arts category from the Canada Council for the Arts. In 2013, she was an artist in residence at The Art Gallery of Ontario where she created actions, like Tea Service (Conservators Will Wash the Dishes) and Your Temper, My Weather, that animated the collections and environments of the gallery. Borsato is an Associate Professor of Interdisciplinary Studio at the University of Guelph where she teaches in the areas of 2D Integrated Media, Extended Practices and in the MFA program. She creates advanced, thematic studio courses that explore social and conceptual practices that have included Food and Art, Special Topics on Walking, LIVE ART and Outdoor School.

Borsato is considered to be at the forefront of relational, interventionist and performative practices in Canada. In his essay, The Knowing of Diane Borsato, Philip Monk, Curator and Director of the Art Gallery of York University, unpacks and elucidates the complexity of her art practice saying, "she might alternately be described as a performance artist, an interventionist, or a relational aesthetician. None of these, though, adequately describe the subtlety, intimacy, and often wry absurdity of her work. The artist proposes alternate forms of knowledge and processes of learning that are eccentric – yet mundane – researches into the forms and experience and boundaries of everyday life."

== Education ==
Borsato graduated with honors from York University earning a Bachelor of Fine Arts in Studio Art (1997). She holds a Master of Fine Arts from Concordia University in Sculpture and New Media (2001) and a Master of Arts in Performance Studies from the Tisch School of the Arts at New York University (2003).
