= Mattie Gunterman =

Canadian photographer (1872–1945)

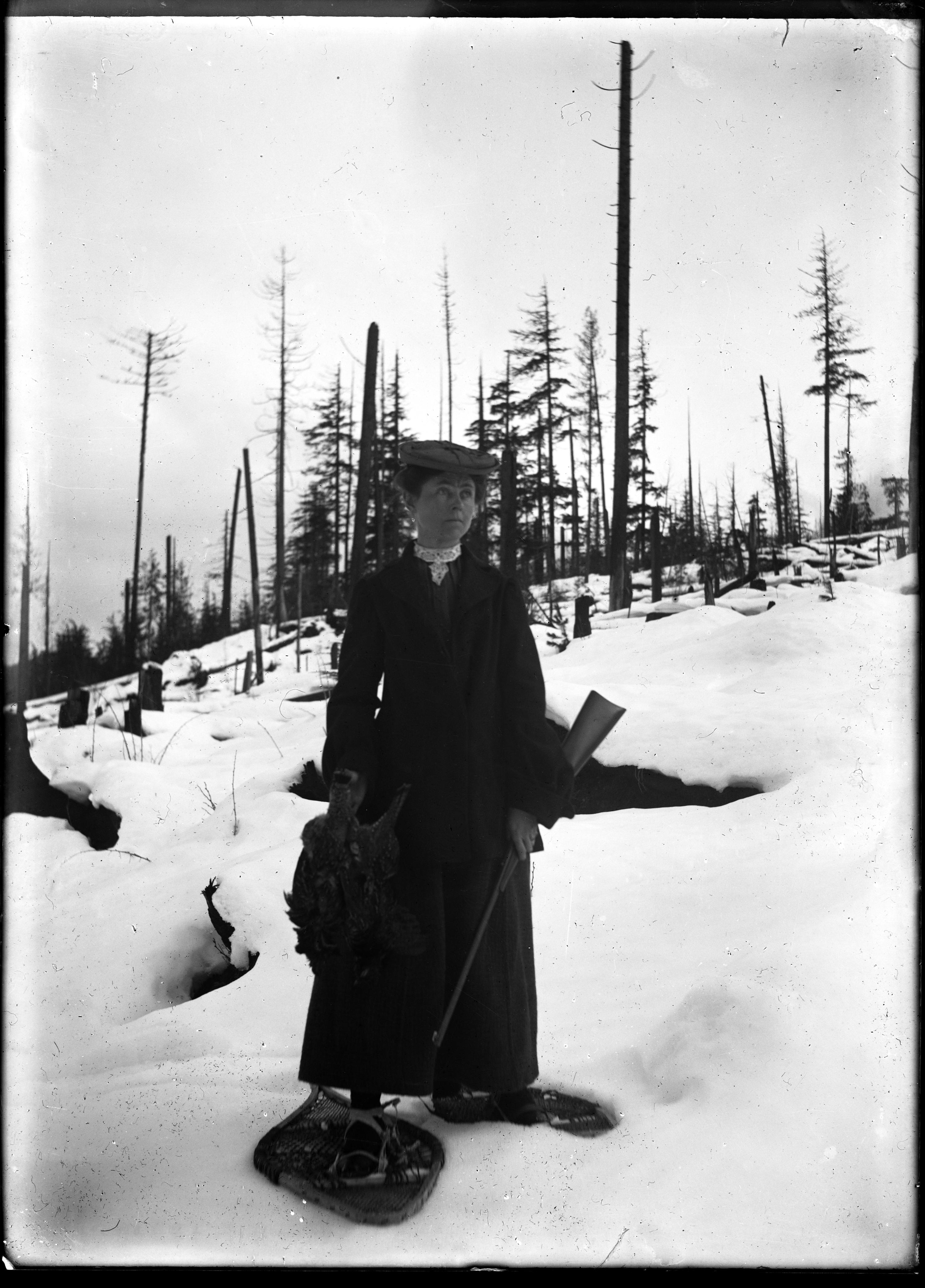
- Mattie Gunterman with grouse.
- Born: Ida Madeline Warner; 1872; La Crosse, Wisconsin
- Died: 1945 (aged 72–73)
- Known for: Photography

Mattie Gunterman, born Ida Madeline Warner (Spring 1872 – 1945), was a Canadian photographer and mining camp cook in British Columbia.

Gunterman started taking photos in the spring of 1897, mainly documenting her family and from that point forward her interest and skill in photography continued to grow. From the years 1899 to 1911, she served as a cook at a mining camp while also creating autobiographical photographs. She received some formal training about the basics of photography while growing up in La Crosse from her photographer uncle. Gunterman often included herself in her photographs creating a personal narrative of pioneer life in Canada and representing herself as a self-sufficient and confident leader.

She contributed a notable historical record of the early 1900s mining boom in Lardeau, a former mining region located in the Kootenays region of British Columbia. In 1927, the Gunterman's home in Beaton was destroyed by a fire therefore much of her work was lost. The only existing work of Gunterman's are three photograph albums that currently belong to her grandson, Avery Gunterman and three hundred glass plate negatives that are part of the Vancouver Public Library collection. An exhibition of her work alongside Emily Carr's was on display at the Vancouver Art Gallery from May 5 to September 3, 2018.

== Personal life ==
=== 1887 to 1889 ===
Mattie Gunterman was born in La Crosse, Wisconsin and not much is known about her family or childhood. An 1880 United States census provides confirmation that she lived with her grandmother and that her mother was born in Pennsylvania and her father was born in Michigan. She continuously battled health problems throughout her life. She learned photography from an uncle who had a studio in La Crosse. In 1889 she left La Crosse and moved west to Seattle, Washington.

=== 1889 to 1898 ===
She married William Gunterman, a candy maker in 1891 and the two had one son together, Henry, in 1892. She had consistent problems with her lungs and her health significantly weakened in 1896. In 1897 the Guntermans trekked to British Columbia to see about moving there permanently and along this trip she took some of her earliest photographs. Her health was a major factor that influenced her life and she was advised by her doctor to move to a drier climate. Thus her and her husband decided to permanently move from Seattle to Beaton, British Columbia, formerly known as Thomson's Landing in 1898. Although Gunterman continuously struggled with her health, she had a survivalist attitude and persevered through twelve-hour shifts at the mining cookhouses.

== Career ==
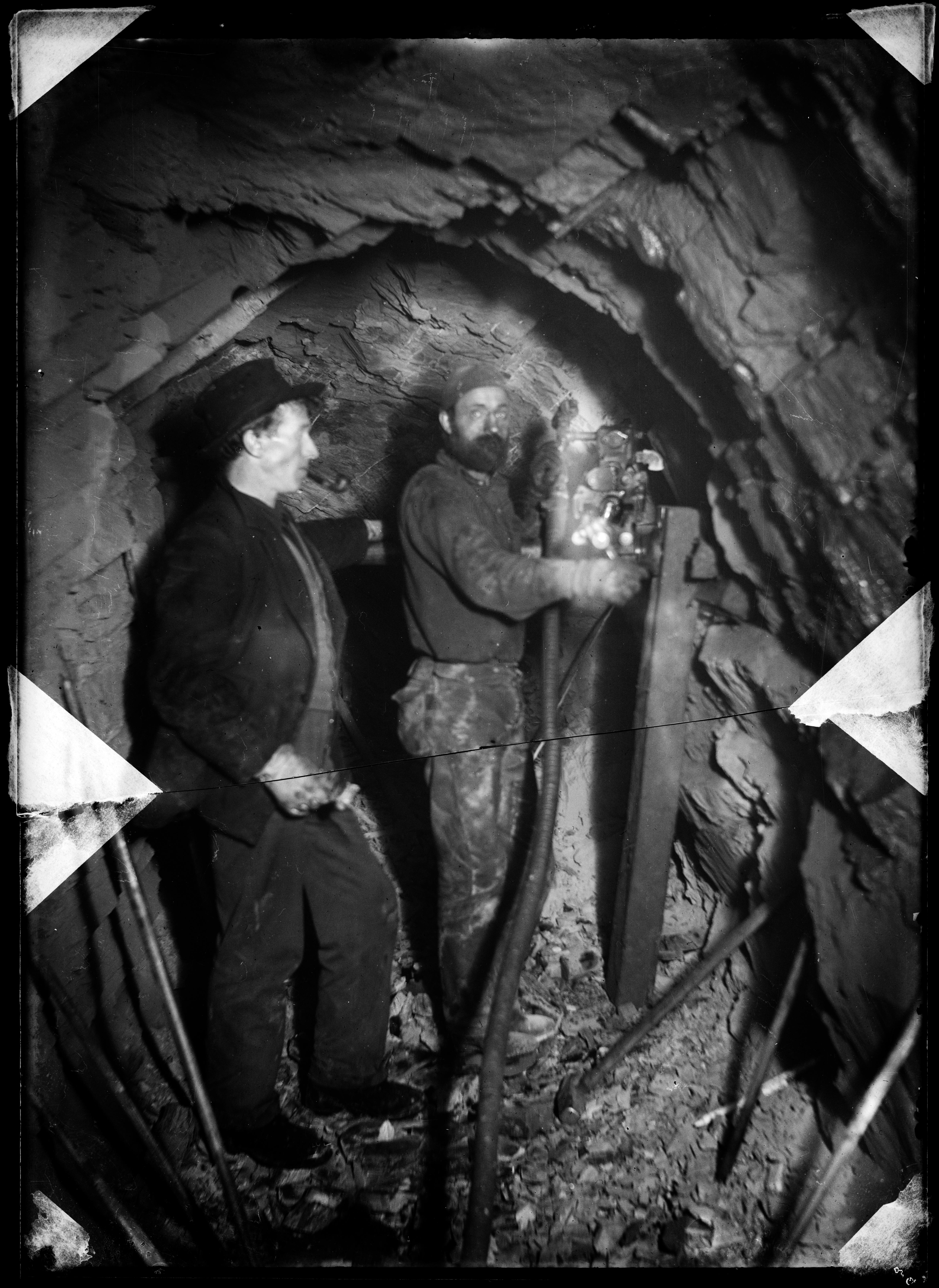
Two miners drilling inside the Nettie L. mine in Ferguson.

Gunterman mainly took photographs from 1897 to 1911. Her photographs were mainly taken in areas surrounding Beaton and the Arrow Lakes District of British Columbia as well as in the Pacific Northwest and California during her travels there in 1905. Typically during the winter months Gunterman would develop her glass plate negatives and turn them into prints. Initially, her primary purpose for taking photographs was to record her life, family and surroundings for her son Henry. She created her own autobiographical narrative through her photographs. In order to create self-portraits and to include herself in group photos, Gunterman would use a piece of rubber tubing attached to the camera's inflatable shutter at one end and a rubber bulb at the other to take the picture. The first camera that she used was a Bull's Eye snapshot camera. Her works at the start mainly consisted of posed group photos. She then purchased a No.5 Cartridge Kodak 4 x 5 plate camera in 1898 as it allowed for more versatility when playing with exposure, focusing and shutter speed. In 1902 Gunterman became the chef at the Nettie-L mine in the Lardeau region and at each long work shift she brought along her camera. She captured everyday life at the mine such as scenic views of the Lardeau region, men working hard in the mine and her fellow kitchen co-workers. Her photographs expose the gruelling work at the mine but also focus on more lighthearted aspects such as games they would play. Mining operations such as the Nettie-L and other surrounding mines totally ceased by 1905. However within the Kootenays logging activity increased and became another subject for Gunterman to photograph. Her work is essential for understanding life during the mining boom in the early 1900s. Furthermore, her photographs of both mining and logging activity are fundamental for understanding the jobs that drove the Canadian economy during the turn of the century. Gunterman's work is also some of the only photographic evidence of these mining towns when they were flourishing.

== Later years and legacy ==
During the late 1910s and into the 1920s when Beaton had become a quieter area, Gunterman, along with her husband Will worked as travelling cooks in nearby areas. In 1927, the Guntermans home burned down therefore many of her photographs were destroyed. However, a number of glass plate negatives and a few albums were stored elsewhere so they survived. Gunterman died in 1945 and three of her photograph albums are currently in the possession of her grandson, Avery Gunterman. Ron D'Altroy of the Vancouver Public Library became interested in Gunterman's work in 1961 and rediscovered three hundred of her glass plate negatives in Henry Gunterman's attic. After collecting these photographs and gaining permission to keep them, the Vancouver Public Library Board digitized her photographs. Her photographs help to reveal life in the Kootenay region of British Columbia. Gunterman's work continues to gain more attention as it has become more accessible to the public through its digitization. From April 28 to September 3, 2018 her work was displayed alongside Emily Carr's at the Vancouver Art Gallery in an exhibition entitled "Emily Carr in Dialogue with Mattie Gunterman."
