= Isidor Sauers =

Austrian-born American (born 1948)

Isidor Sauers (born 1948) is an Austrian-born American who is a physicist at the Oak Ridge National Laboratory in Tennessee. He is a specialist on the properties of Sulfur hexafluoride (SF_{6}), with an important patent and over 60 peer-reviewed academic papers.

== Papers ==
His most notable paper, "Electron Attachment to the perfluoroalkanes" in Journal of Chemical Physics 78 (12) 7200-7216 has been cited 88 times since its publication in 1983.

== Patent ==
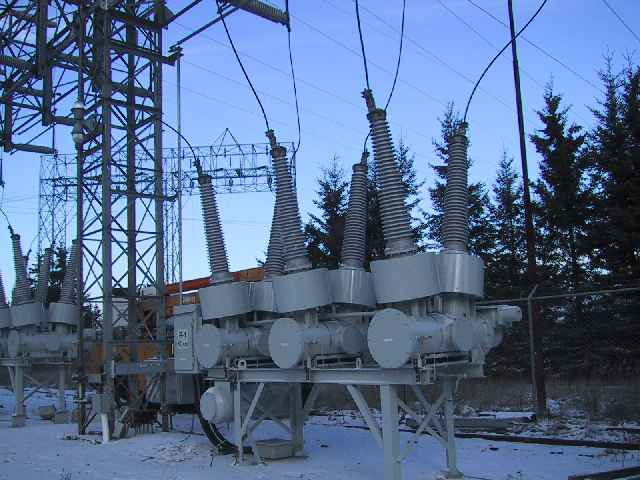
A high-voltage circuit breaker mounted outdoors at the substation near the Manitoba Hydro Slave Falls generating station. The horizontal cylindrical tanks contain the interrupters which operate in an envelope filled with SF_{6} gas.

In the early 1980s, Sauers developed a novel method by which to measure the degradation of Sulfur hexafluoride (SF_{6}) in high-voltage systems. SF_{6}, a hypervalent molecule, is used as a gaseous insulator in conjunction with solid insulating material in high voltage systems such as transmission lines, substations and switchgear. When the dielectric strength of SF_{6} is exceeded, regions of high electrical stress can cause nearby gas to partially ionize and begin conducting, forming toxic products like SOF_{2} or S_{2}F_{10}. This method allows scientists to detect the toxic by-products of SF_{6} breakdown at very low concentrations (ppb) using an ion-molecule reaction cell and a negative ion mass spectrometer, as opposed to conventional methods such as electron impact mass spectrometry (MS), gas chromatography (GC) with thermal conductivity detection, gas chromatography with electron capture detection, or a combination of gas chromatography and mass spectrometry.

== See also ==
- Circuit breaker
- International Electrotechnical Commission (IEC)
- Dielectric strength
- Dielectric constant
