= June Sauer =

Canadian fashion photographer

June Sauer (born 1924 or 1927) is a Canadian fashion photographer who specialized in photographing fur.

She was born in Thunder Bay (Port Arthur or Fort William at the time) and moved to Montreal in the late 1940s. There she married photographer Max Sauer. She learned photography from him and took over his studio after his death in 1954. Her clients included the Ogilvy department store, Holt Renfrew, the Fur Traders Association, Valentino and Chanel. She also photographed the cast of the satirical play My Fur Lady for McGill University. A book called From the beaver to Brigitte Bardot, by author Mrs. Nadeau acclaimed her attributes with a chapter entitled Through the Eyes of June Sauer

Her photographs capture the interaction and the contrast in textures between the white female model's skin and the fur garment. Sauer worked closely with her models and, as a woman, she felt that the models interacted with her differently than they would have with a male photographer.

In 1965, with Florence King Blackwell, she produced a fur fashion and tourist report for Montreal magazine called The Beauties of Montreal.

In 1966, Ogilvy presented a retrospective of her work.

In 1969, Sauer received the Craftsman of Photographic Arts award from the Professional Photographers of Canada. She also received a Merit Award from the Professional Photographers of America.
