= Christopher Derrick =

British writer (1921–2007)

- Born: 12 June 1921; Hungerford, England
- Died: 2 October 2007 (aged 86)
- Occupations: publisher's reader, reviewer, essayist
- Spouse: Katharine Helen Sharratt
- Children: eight sons and a daughter
- Relatives: Thomas Derrick (father), Michael Derrick (brother)
- Writing career
- Period: 20th century

Christopher Hugh Derrick (12 June 1921 – 2 October 2007) was a British author, reviewer, publisher's reader and lecturer. All his works are informed by wide interest in contemporary problems and a lively commitment to Catholic teaching.

== Literary career ==
Most interest in Derrick has been in his memories of G. K. Chesterton, who was a friend of his father, and more especially C. S. Lewis, who was Derrick's tutor at Magdalen. He was constantly being asked by Lewis's Catholic admirers – such as the German Neo-Thomist, Josef Pieper, two of whose works Derrick had reviewed – why Lewis himself never became a Catholic. He provided as definitive an answer as possible in his 1981 book C. S. Lewis and the Church of Rome. Another friend was the economist E. F. Schumacher, whose interest in Catholic social teaching he shared.

Besides working as a literary adviser to a number of British publishing houses, Derrick was also a prolific book reviewer, among other publications for The Times Literary Supplement as well as for The Tablet, where his brother Michael Derrick was the assistant editor from 1938 to 1961. For a time he was himself the editor of Good Work, the journal of the Catholic Art Association.

Most of Derrick's writings, however, draw less on such literary reminiscences than on reflection on matters of pressing public concern within and outside the Catholic Church in the 1960s, 70s and 80s: the environment, social relations, sexual relations, population, liturgy, ecumenism, inter-religious dialogue, education, and the current state of language and literature. One of the more successful of these books was Escape from Scepticism, a work inspired by the great books programme at Thomas Aquinas College in California.

== Books by Christopher Derrick ==
- The Moral and Social Teaching of the Church. New Library of Catholic Knowledge vol. 8. London: Burns & Oates. 1964.
- Cosmic Piety: Modern Man and the Meaning of the Universe, edited by Christopher Derrick. New York: P. J. Kennedy & Sons, 1965.
- Light of Revelation and Non-Christians, edited by Christopher Derrick. Staten Island, NY: Alba House. 1965.
- Trimming the Ark: Catholic Attitudes and the Cult of Change. London: Hutchinson. 1969. ISBN 0-09-096850-6
- Reader's Report on the Writing of Novels: a publisher's reader examines the pitfalls facing the aspiring novelist. London: Gollancz. 1969. ISBN 0-575-00266-2
- Honest Love and Human Life: Is the Pope Right about Contraception?. London: Hutchinson. 1969. ISBN 0-09-098780-2
- The Delicate Creation: Towards a Theology of the Environment. London: Tom Stacey Ltd. 1972. ISBN 0-85468-203-1
- Escape from Scepticism: Liberal Education as if Truth Mattered. LaSalle, Ill.: Sherwood Sugden. 1977. ISBN 0-89385-002-9. Reissued by Ignatius Press. 2001. ISBN 978-0-89870-848-6
- Joy Without a Cause: Selected Essays of Christopher Derrick. La Salle, Ill.: Sherwood Sugden. 1979. ISBN 0-89385-004-7
- The Rule of Peace: St. Benedict and the European Future. Still River, Mass.: St. Bede's Publications. 1980. ISBN 0-932506-01-1. Reissued 2002. ISBN 978-0-932506-01-6
- C. S. Lewis and the Church of Rome: A Study in Proto-Ecumenism. San Francisco: Ignatius Press. 1981. ISBN 0-89870-009-4
- Church Authority and Intellectual Freedom. San Francisco: Ignatius Press. 1981. ISBN 0-89870-011-6
- Sex and Sacredness: A Catholic Homage to Venus. San Francisco: Ignatius Press. 1982. ISBN 0-89870-018-3
- That Strange Divine Sea: Reflections on Being a Catholic. San Francisco: Ignatius Press. 1983. ISBN 0-89870-029-9
- Too Many People? A Problem in Values. San Francisco: Ignatius Press. 1985. ISBN 0-89870-071-X
- Words and the Word: Notes on our Catholic vocabulary. San Francisco: Ignatius Press. 1987. ISBN 0-89870-130-9

== See also ==
- Hilaire Belloc and G. K. Chesterton
