= Katharine Clausen =

Irish painter

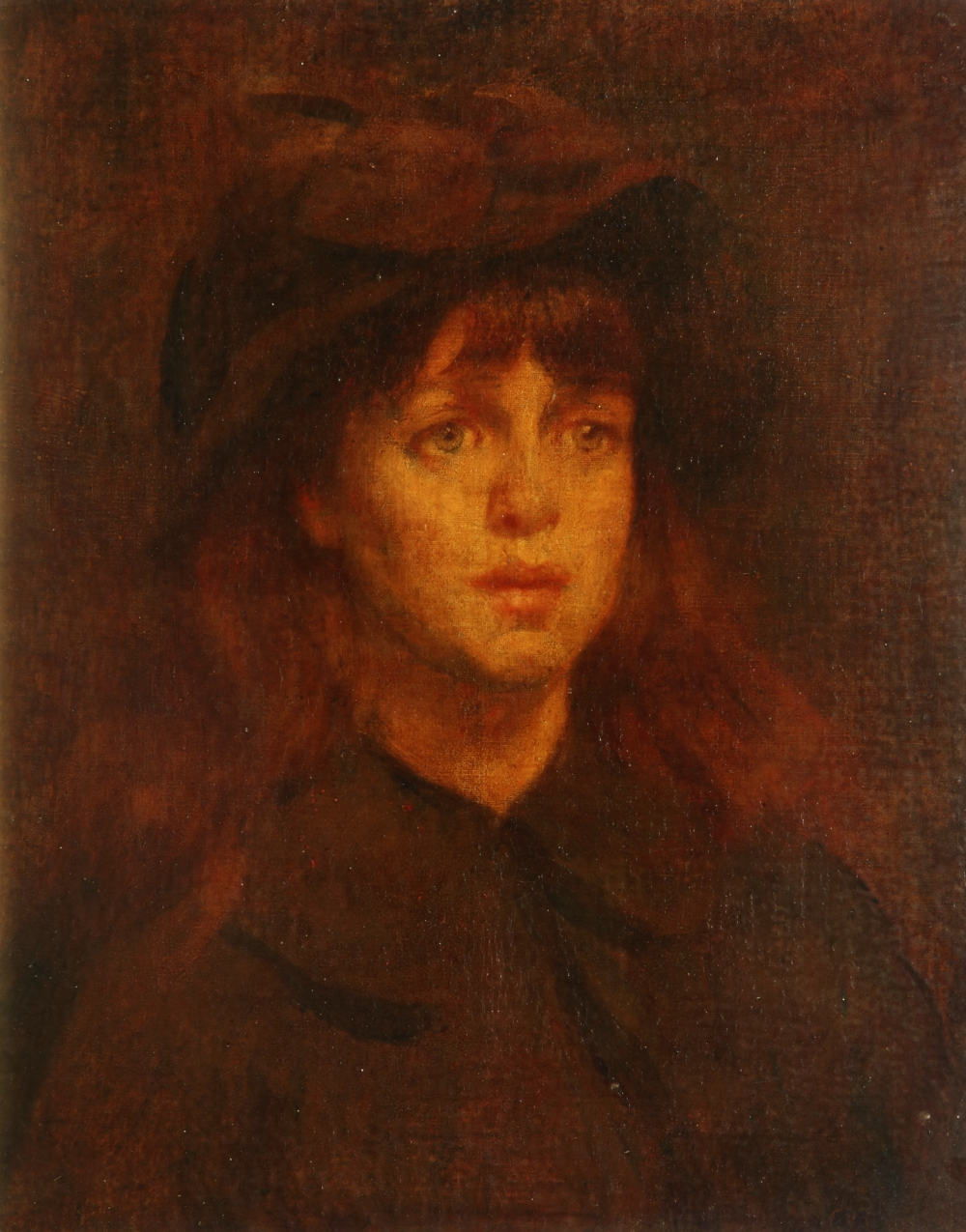
- Portrait of Clausen by her father
- Born: Katharine Frances Clausen; 15 March 1886; New York City, United States
- Died: 27 July 1936 (aged 50); Truro, Cornwall
- Known for: portrait, figure, and landscape painting
- Spouse: Edward Conor Marshall O'Brien
- Parent(s): George Clausen, Agnes Mary Webster

Katharine Clausen also known as Katharine O'Brien (15 March 1886-27 July 1936) was an Irish portrait, figure, and landscape painter.

== Early life ==
Katharine Frances Clausen was born on 15 March 1886 in New York, United States. She was the second daughter of artists, Sir George Clausen and Agnes Mary Webster. Her father painted her numerous times as "Kitty". She had one sister, Margaret who went onto marry the painter Thomas Derrick, and three brothers. She studied at the Royal Academy Schools, winning the Landseer Scholarship and other prizes there. During World War I she served as a nurse. Clausen's fiancé died on 12 March 1915 while fighting with the 1st Battalion the Highland Light Infantry. Clausen's father commemorated that loss with the painting Youth Mourning.

== Career ==
Mount Ida from Malaxo by Clausen

Clausen exhibited with the Royal Academy, Fine Art Society, New English Art Club and the Royal Society of Painters in Watercolours. In 1914, she illustrated Nancy in the Wood by Marion Brye. In the 1920s, Clausen was commissioned to paint a series of portraits of the employees of the Crittall Window Company known as the "Old Iron Portrait" series.

In 1928, she married Edward Conor Marshall O'Brien, an architect and writer and a member of Sinn Féin. She then took on the Irish nationality. Her brother-in-law was Dermod O'Brien. Her husband was a master mariner, and the couple sailed the world together in a small yacht, Saoirse.

She assisted her father as he completed a mural for St. Stephen's Hall in the Houses of Parliament between 1925 and 1927. She exhibited with the Royal Hibernian Academy (RHA) in 1929, with a portrait of her husband. The portrait was later exhibited at the 1966 Easter Rising Golden Jubilee exhibition at the National Gallery of Ireland. She went on to show 19 works with the RHA between 1931 and 1936. In 1927, her work was featured in an exhibition of "living British artists" at the Belfast Museum and Art Gallery. From 1931, she and her husband sailed around the Mediterranean. Also in 1931, she became an associate of the Royal Society of Painters in Watercolours. 50 of her illustrations were included in the 1933 edition of her husband's book, Voyage and Discovery. She was described as having "great personal charm and high sense of humour".

== Death and legacy ==
Clausen fell ill in Truro, Cornwall, possibly with leukaemia, and was admitted to hospital, where she died on 27 July 1936. She is buried in the churchyard of St Just-in-Roseland with a headstone designed by her husband. The Beaux Arts Gallery, London, mounted a memorial exhibition in 1936 after her death. Examples of her work are held in the Braintree District Museum, British Museum, Crawford Art Gallery and the National Museum of Wales.
