= Good Work =

Good Work may refer to:

- Beau travail (Good Work), a 1999 French film
- Good Work, official magazine of the Catholic Art Association (earlier called the Catholic Art Quarterly)
- Good works, in Christian theology
- Good Work (TV series), a talk show on E! about plastic surgery which premiered in 2015
