= Edward Conor Marshall O'Brien =

- Portrait of O'Brien by his Katharine Clausen
- Born: 3 November 1880; Kensington, London, England
- Died: 18 April 1952 (aged 71); Foynes, County Limerick
- Resting place: Loghill Church of Ireland church near Mount Trenchard, County Limerick
- Spouse: Katharine Clausen

Edward Conor Marshall O'Brien known as Conor O'Brien (3 November 1880 – 18 April 1952) was an Irish aristocrat and intellectual. His views were republican and nationalist. He was also owner and captain of one of the first boats to sail under the tri-colour of the Irish Free State. He was the first amateur Irish sailor to sail around the world.

O'Brien was a grandson of the Young Irelander William Smith O'Brien, and learned Irish. He was a ship builder and designer, and his notable boats include the Kelpie, used for gun running in 1914, the Saoirse, in which he circumnavigated the globe, and the Ilen, a Falkland Islands service ship.

== Early life and family ==
Edward Conor Marshall O'Brien was born in his mother's home in Kensington, London on 3 November 1880. His parents were Edward William O'Brien JP, and Julia O'Brien (née Marshall). He had one brother, two sisters, one step-brother, and two step-sisters, including the painter Dermod O'Brien.

His grandfather was William O'Brien who was a member of Young Ireland; his grandfather and his aunt Charlotte Grace O'Brien both played roles in social reform. Robert Donough, his uncle, was an architect. O'Brien was educated in England at Winchester College and Oxford, and in Ireland in Trinity College. After his education he came back to Ireland and started practising as an architect in 1903. According to the 1911 census he lived at 58 Mount Street, south County Dublin.

In 1928, he married the artist, Katharine Clausen. They lived aboard the Saoirse, travelling extensively until her death in Truro, Cornwall in 1936. O'Brien designed her headstone in the churchyard of St Just-in-Roseland.

== Career ==
=== Architect ===
O'Brien was credited with two buildings in his lifetime: People's Hall, Kilmallock (1914), and Cope Hall, Dungloe, both in County Limerick. Both designed for rural co-operatives. He was elected to the council of the Dublin Industrial Development Association in 1910. He was also known as a naval architect, having designed two ships, the Saoirse and the llen. He would later captain both of these ships himself.

=== Role in Irish Independence and gun running ===
O'Brien had become interested in the Irish language and Irish independence. He was a fluent Irish speaker, chief patron of an Irish-language college in Carrigaholt, County Clare, and leader of the Clare Irish Volunteers. He had some involvement with gun running in 1914 on behalf of the Irish Volunteers because he had experience in sailing. On 26 July 1914, 900 guns were brought to Howth harbour aboard Erskine Childers' yacht Asgard. As part of the same operation O'Brien transported arms on his yacht, Kelpie. The guns on Kelpie were transhipped to another yacht, Chotah, owned by Sir Thomas Myles, before being landed at Kilcoole in County Wicklow on 1 August 1914. After the gun running incidents, O'Brien served in the Royal Naval Volunteer Reserve.

In 1919, O'Brien was appointed inspector of fisheries for the second Dáil. He ran unsuccessfully for the Seanad in 1925.

=== Across Three Oceans ===
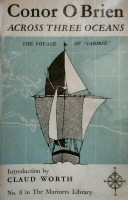
Cover of O'Brien's book Across Three Oceans

After the Kelpie was wrecked in 1921 off the Scottish coast, he moved to Baltimore, County Cork where he designed and built the Saoirse, a 42ft ketch which O'Brien then lived on. O'Brien's boat Saoirse was reputedly the first small boat (42-foot, 13 metres long) to sail around the world since Joshua Slocum completed his voyage in the Spray during 1895 to 1898. a journey that O'Brien documented in his book Across Three Oceans. O'Brien’s voyage began and ended at the Port of Foynes, County Limerick, Ireland, where he lived.

Saoirse, under O'Brien's command and with three crew, was the first yacht to circumnavigate the world by way of the three great capes: Cape Horn, Cape of Good Hope and Cape Leeuwin; and was the first boat flying the Irish tri-colour to enter many of the world's ports and harbours. He ran down his easting in the Roaring Forties and Furious Fifties between the years 1923 and 1925. Up until O'Brien's circumnavigation this route was the preserve of square-rigged grain ships taking part in the grain race from Australia to England via Cape Horn, also known as the clipper route.

He sold the Saoirse to the Royal Cornwall Yacht Club in 1940, where it was used until it was lost off the Jamaican coast in 1980.

=== Ilen ===
O'Brien's seagoing experiences were put to use in his design of the Ilen which was built for the Falkland Islands as a service boat. In 1998 the Ilen was purchased by the Hunt Museum and returned to the site where she was first built, on the river Ilen near Baltimore in south-west Ireland, where she underwent a full restoration and was re-launched in May 2018. This task provided work-based learning for the students of the Ilen School.

The ship was featured on the 35p value Falklands stamp in 1998.

=== Mountaineering ===
O'Brien was a keen mountaineer as well as a sailor. He was known for climbing in bare feet, He climbed Mount Brandon in south-west Ireland and Mount Snowdon in Wales with George Mallory and Geoffrey Winthrop Young among others. Later, during his circumnavigation 1923–1925 he planned to climb Aoraki in the Southern Alps in New Zealand's South Island. However because of delays during his circumnavigation he arrived in New Zealand too late.

== Later life and death ==
After the death of his wife, O'Brien moved to Cornwall where he lived with his sister. There he continued to write children's books and books on sailing. During World War II he served in the Small Ships Pool, delivering support vessels in the Atlantic, and food supplies from the United States. After the war, he moved to live with another sister in Foynes, continuing to write. He died there on 18 April 1952. He is buried at Loghill Church of Ireland church near Mount Trenchard, County Limerick.

== Publications ==
Non-fiction

- Across three oceans
- From three yachts – a cruiser's outlook
- The small ocean-going yacht
- Yacht gear and gadgets
- Sea-boats, oars and sails
- The practical man's cruiser
- On going to sea in yachts
- Deep-water Yacht
- Sea-boats, oars and sails
- Voyage and Discovery (1933)

Fiction

- The Castaways
- The Runaways
- Atlantic Adventure
- The Luck of the Golden Salmon
- Two Boys go Sailing

== Sources ==
- O'Brien, Conor (1926). Across Three Oceans. London: E.Arnold. ISBN 0-246-12309-5.
- Hill, Judith (2009). In Search of Islands, A Life of Conor O'Brien. Cork: The Collins Press. pp. viii, 126. ISBN 9781905172658.
- de Bhaldraithe, Padraic (1996). Loingseoir na Saoirse – Scéal Conor O'Brien. Baile Átha Cliath: Coiscéim.
- Life and ships of Conor O'Brien – documented on the A K Ilen restorer's website.
- Conor O'Brien: Life, Works, Criticism, Notes
- Foynes Yacht Club – History (paragraph 2 on Conor O'Brien and the Saoirse)
