= Ilen School =

Work-based learning organisation in Ireland

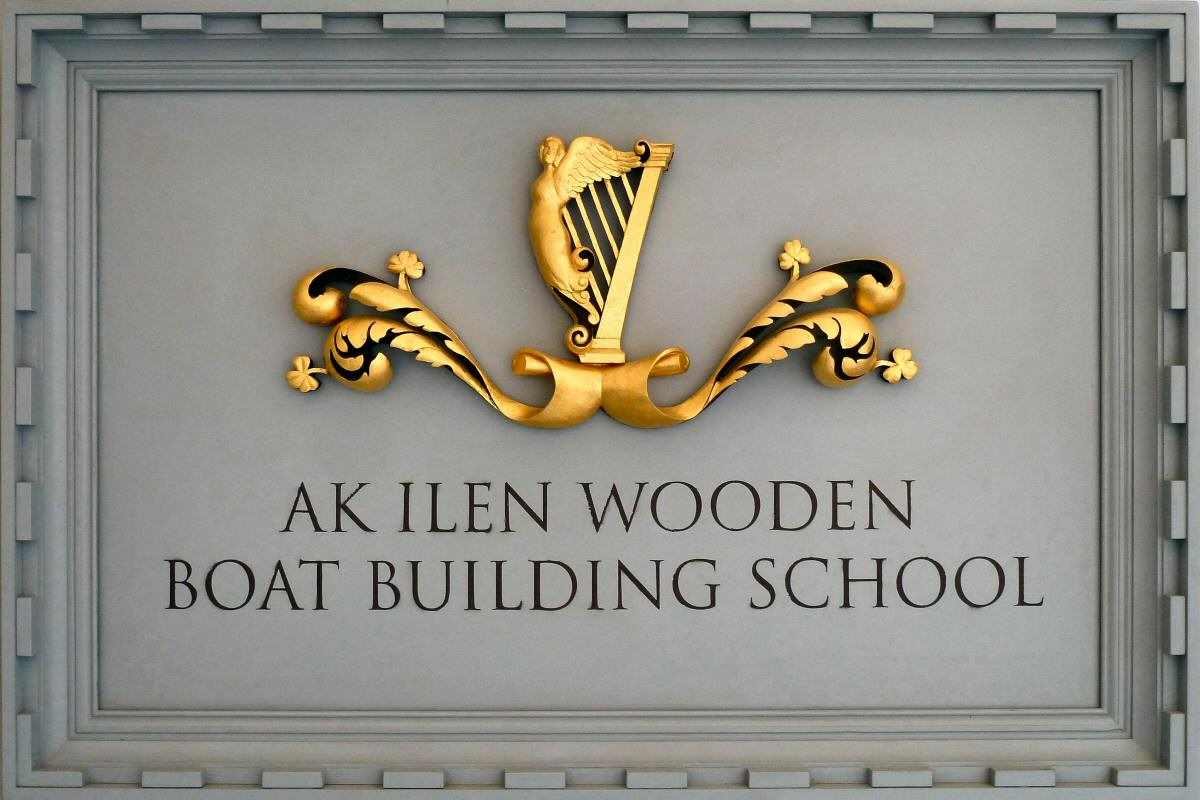
Crest of the Ilen School and Network for Wooden Boat Building

The Ilen School and Network for Wooden Boat Building is a charitable organisation based in Limerick in Ireland. The school provides work-based learning and therapy for students with a range of backgrounds, abilities and needs.

== History ==
The school was formed in 2000 and was based in the Limerick Enterprise Development Partnership (LEDP) building in Roxborough. It was initially an exploratory programme, funded as part of regeneration initiatives in deprived parts of the city. Over time, its reputation has grown and alternative donors have come forward to support its work.

== Activities ==
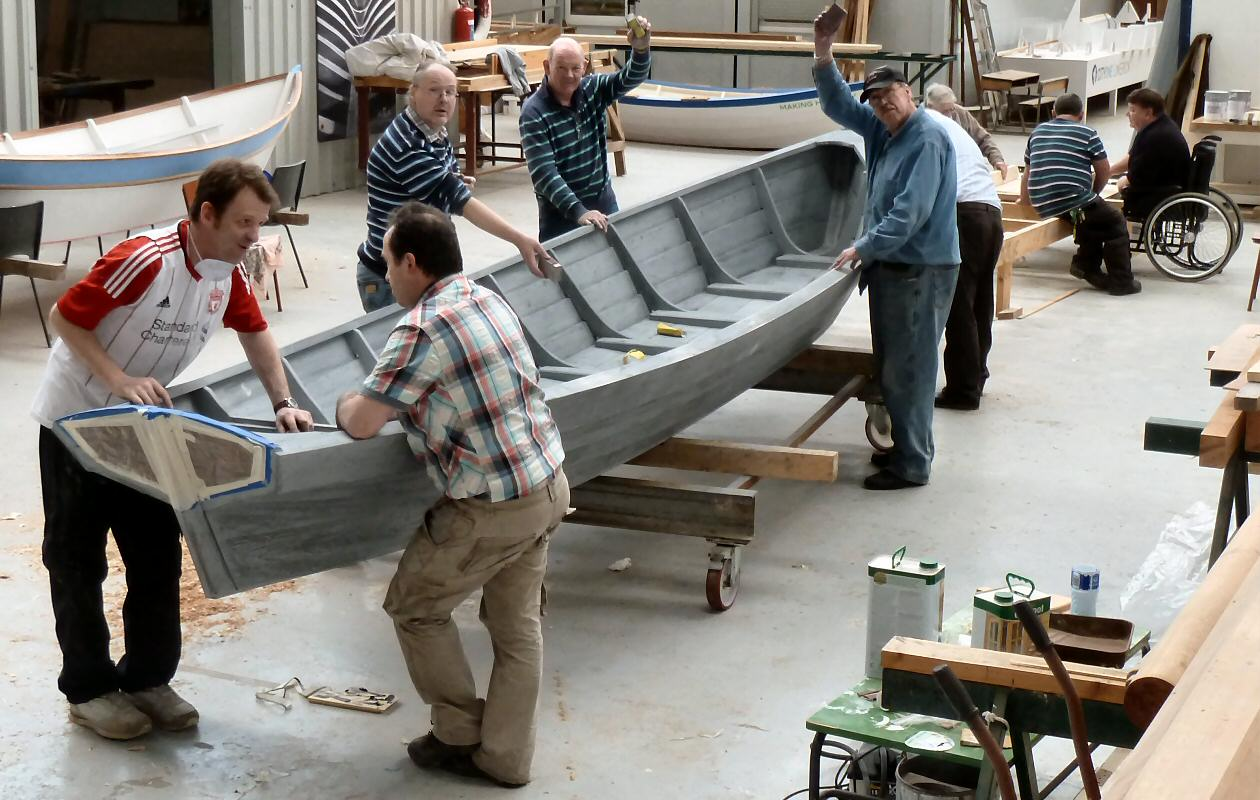
Ilen School students working on a gandelow

A wide range of traditional Irish boats are constructed by the students, including the gandelow, currach and dory. In addition, the school was involved in the rebuilding of the A. K. Ilen (re-launched in May 2018 and from which the school gets its name) which was designed by Edward Conor Marshall O'Brien and built near Baltimore, County Cork in 1926.

The school has had a significant role in building, documenting and (re)educating Irish fishing communities who have lost the expertise to build traditional Irish boats. Courses on currach building have taken place on the Aran Islands and the gandelow is being reintroduced on the Shannon estuary.

== See also ==
- Alternative pathways in education
- Boat Building
