= Gandelow =

Traditional boat type in Ireland

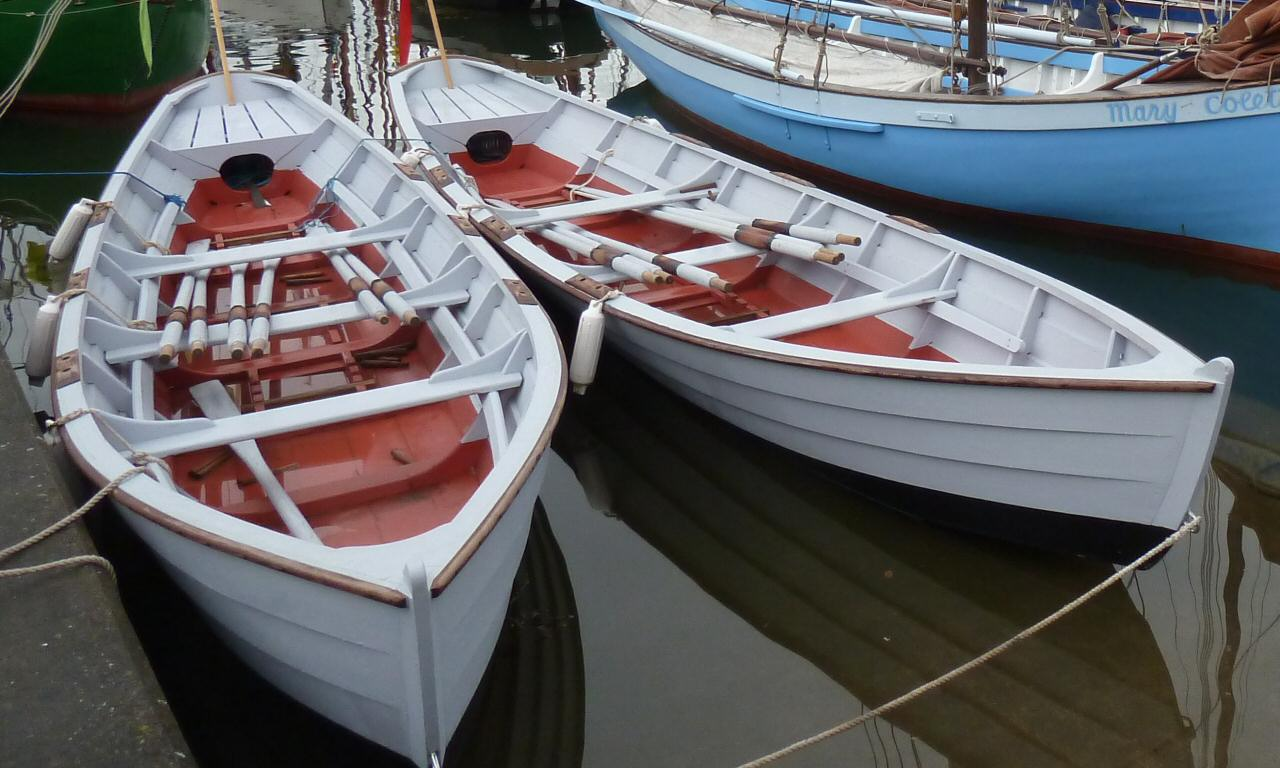
Traditional gandelow fishing boats at Ballydehob in Ireland, 2014

The gandelow is a traditional wooden fishing boat used on the River Shannon on the west coast of Ireland. The boat has been in use by fishing communities since at least the 17th century, mostly for catching salmon and cutting reeds. The gandelow is a flat-bottomed boat about 7 metres long constructed by local craftsmen following traditional designs. It has recently experienced a revival and is now in use for sport, exercise and recreational fishing.

== History ==
The origins of the gandelow's name are unknown - it may be connected with that of the Italian gondola ('small boat') or, possibly, be a version of the Viking name for their flat-bottomed boats. Most gandelows were around 7 metres (23 feet) along and were rowed by two or three fishermen whose main catch was salmon. The boats were also used for cutting thatching reeds and for transporting people and the occasional cow or sheep. In Limerick, some boats were used to take pilots out to the ocean-going vessels or acted as small lighters transporting goods to the docks. The boat's variations in form reflect the unique different conditions up and down the Shannon estuary.

In Limerick, the fishing village was on Clancy Strand opposite King John's Castle. The story of the gandelow has been described in Jim McInerney's book "The Gandelow: a Shannon Estuary Fishing Boat" published in 2005. The fishermen of those times would no doubt be astonished to see that their working boat is now being built again, prized by the Limerick riverside community for its beauty and raced for entertainment and exercise.

By the 1950s it was getting harder to find the long spruce boards needed for building the boats and so shorter boats of 21 feet, or even 18 feet long became more common. Eventually, gandelow building faded away as fish stocks declined and limits on fishing on the Shannon were applied.

== Construction ==
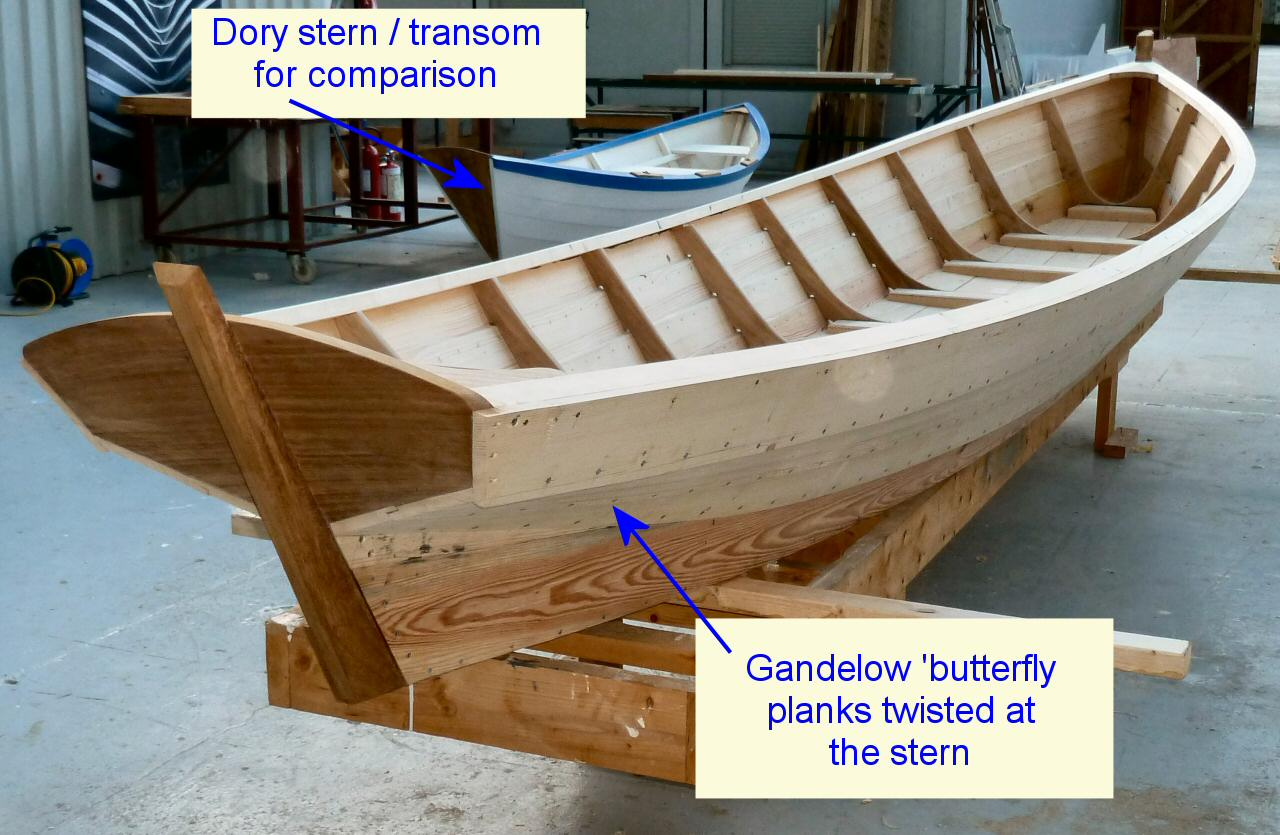
Gandelow under construction at the Ilen School and Network for Wooden Boat Building, 2014

The 23-foot boats of the traditional Shannon type are specialised craft which evolved different forms in various parts of the estuary over the centuries. These variations enabled the fishermen to deal with the challenges of the river with its exceptional tidal range. The different forms are described in the book "Traditional Boats of Ireland" (2008). The gandelow has 'butterfly planks' at the stern and this design feature (seen in the photograph) differentiates it from the Dory which is superficially similar.

Gandelow building requires the kind of long, clean planks that were available in Limerick's timber port - maybe that's one reason why gandelow building became popular there. Most fishing families had at least one member who had the skills and eye to be a boatbuilder. These skills were handed down within the families where such expertise was a considerable asset. As a result, templates and plans were jealously guarded and so few records remain.

The boatbuilder's shed would be a modest affair - nothing like a modern workshop. Nevertheless, the boats were made with care and became handy craft which could last up to twenty years if maintained well. The construction techniques were simple and effective, the tools used minimal and a great deal of 'eye' was used to fair the lines. Each boat was therefore unique with parts shaped to fit the minor variations caused by the quality of wood available and whether the builder used any moulds, frames or templates (many did not). Gandelows are being built again in Limerick. Four were built at the Ilen School and Network for Wooden Boat Building in 2014. The build process was carefully documented and a book produced which serves as a record for future generations.

== Sailing ==
Traditionally the gandelows had no standing rigging. On the occasions when the westerly wind was right to blow the boats back up the Shannon then a simple sacking sail would be fastened to an upright oar (as Jim McInerney's book explains). Another oar would be tied over the stern as a rudder. The Ilen School tested the performance of the boats with two simple sails based on the traditional design: a Square rig and a standing Lug sail.

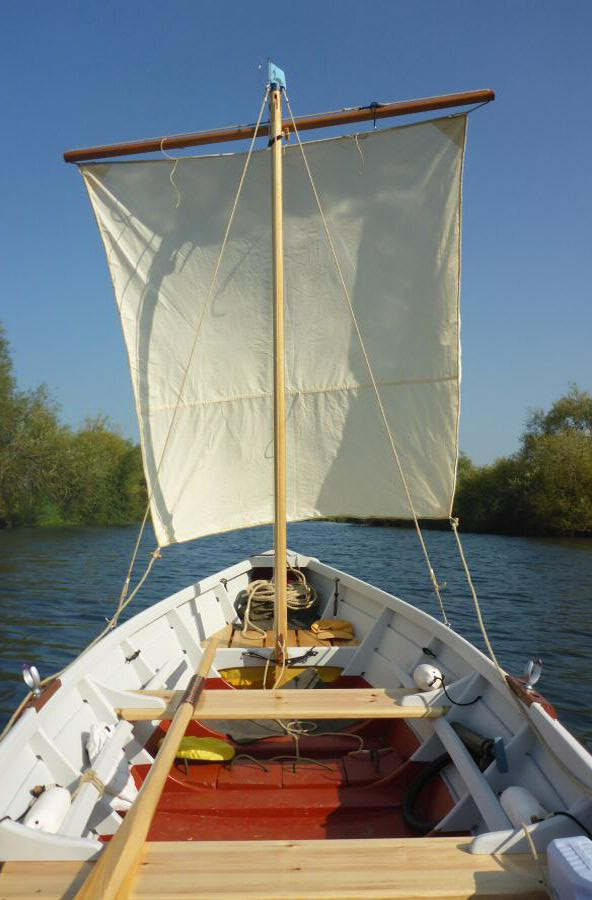
A simple square sail on a small gandelow

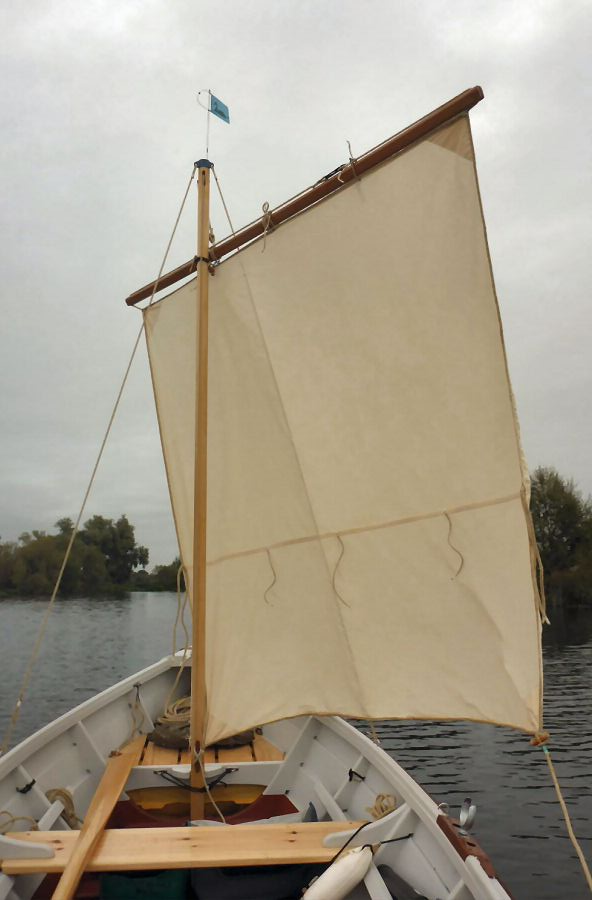
A simple calico standing lugsail on a small gandelow

The School also tried a Spritsail, but this time steering with a conventional rudder. This arrangement was harder to control because the 'centre of effort' of the sail was too far aft.

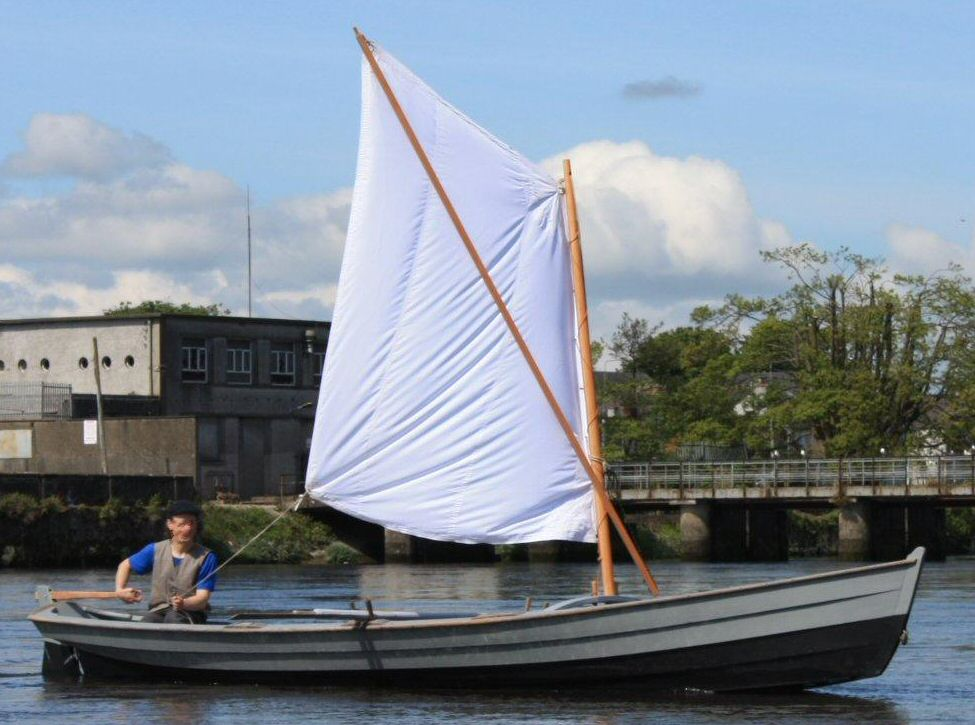
A gandelow rigged with a spritsail and a rudder

== Gandelows, gundalows and gondolas ==
In 2014, at the invitation of the mayor of Venice, four gandelows were taken there to take part in the annual Festa degli asparagi (Asparagus festival). This was also an opportunity to directly compare the gandelow with local Italian boats of a similar design (such as the 's'ciopon' - meaning 'big gun'- or a 'sandolo'). Indeed, when seen side by side, there were many similarities in design and methods of construction which lent some support to the theory, voiced anecdotally in Ireland, that the names gandelow and gondola were somehow connected. However, no conclusive evidence has been found yet. There is also the New England Gundalow to consider, though this is a barge not a fishing boat.

== See also ==
- Fishing vessels
- Boat building
- Gundalow, a type of flat-bottomed sailing boat in New England
