= Thomas Myles =

Surgeon, sportsman and gunrunner (1857–1937)

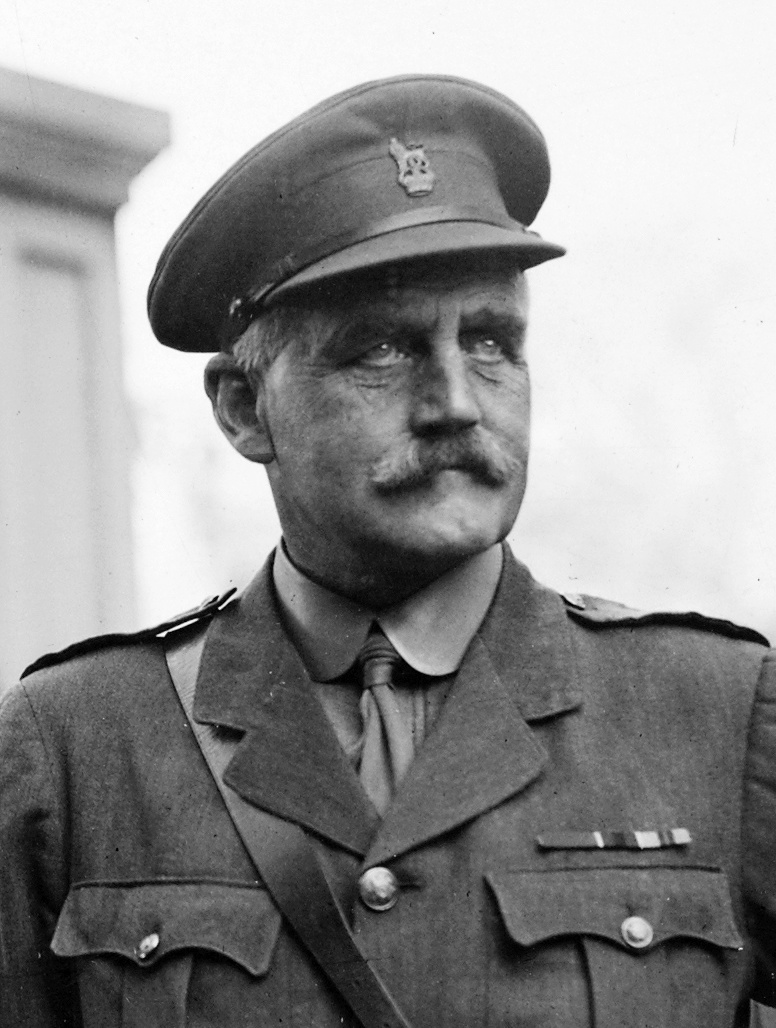
Myles in 1918

Sir Thomas Myles CB FRCSI (20 April 1857—14 July 1937) was a prominent Irish home ruler and surgeon, involved in the importation of arms for the Irish Volunteers in 1914.

== Early life ==
Thomas Myles was born in Limerick in 1857, the third of eleven children born to John Myles (1807–1871), a wealthy corn merchant, and his second wife Prudence, daughter of William Bradshaw of Canal House, Limerick. The Myles family had been prominent merchants in and around Limerick city since Cromwell's time.

A prominent sportsman from an early age, Myles graduated in medicine at Trinity College Dublin in 1881. One of his duties in his first job as resident surgeon at Dr. Steevens's Hospital was to render medical assistance to the victims of the Phoenix Park murders on 6 May 1882.

== Career ==
From 1900 till 1902, Myles was President of the Royal College of Surgeons in Ireland. After stepping down, he was appointed a Knight Bachelor in the 1902 Coronation Honours list published on 26 June 1902, and knighted by the Lord Lieutenant of Ireland, Earl Cadogan, at Dublin Castle on 11 August 1902. He also received the honorary freedom of his native city.

=== Kilcoole arms landing ===
Myles was also an active Home Ruler. He owned a yacht, the Chotah. In 1914, he was recruited (by James Creed Meredith) to help in the importation of guns for the Irish Volunteers with Erskine Childers, Conor O'Brien and others. Childers landed his part of the consignment from the Asgard at Howth on 26 July 1914. Myles's cargo was landed by the Chotah at Kilcoole, county Wicklow a week later, on the night of 1/2 August. Meredith himself helped out aboard the Chotah during the operation. On 1 August 1914, 600 Mauser rifles and 20,000 rounds of ammunition were landed at the beach in Kilcoole, County Wicklow in Ireland.

The arms and ammunition was smuggled using his boat The Chotah during the night. Once the arms were landed they were taken away by Volunteers on bicycles and in vehicles. The arms were taken to Patrick Pearse's school, St Enda's, in Rathfarnham, County Dublin.

== Later career ==
Myles was appointed temporary Lieutenant-Colonel in the Royal Army Medical Corps on 21 November 1914 and also became Honorary Surgeon in Ireland to the King. He was appointed to be an Additional Member of the Military Division of the Third Class, or Companion, of the Most Honourable Order of the Bath, for services rendered in connection with the war, the appointment to date from 1 January 1917.

He died on 14 July 1937 and is buried at Deansgrange Cemetery in Dublin.

== Legacy ==
The gun running on the Chotah was reenacted 100 years later.
