= Chapel + Cultural Center at Rensselaer =

Coordinates: 42.731757°N 73.672299°W

Christ Sun of Justice
- University Parish of Christ Sun of Justice
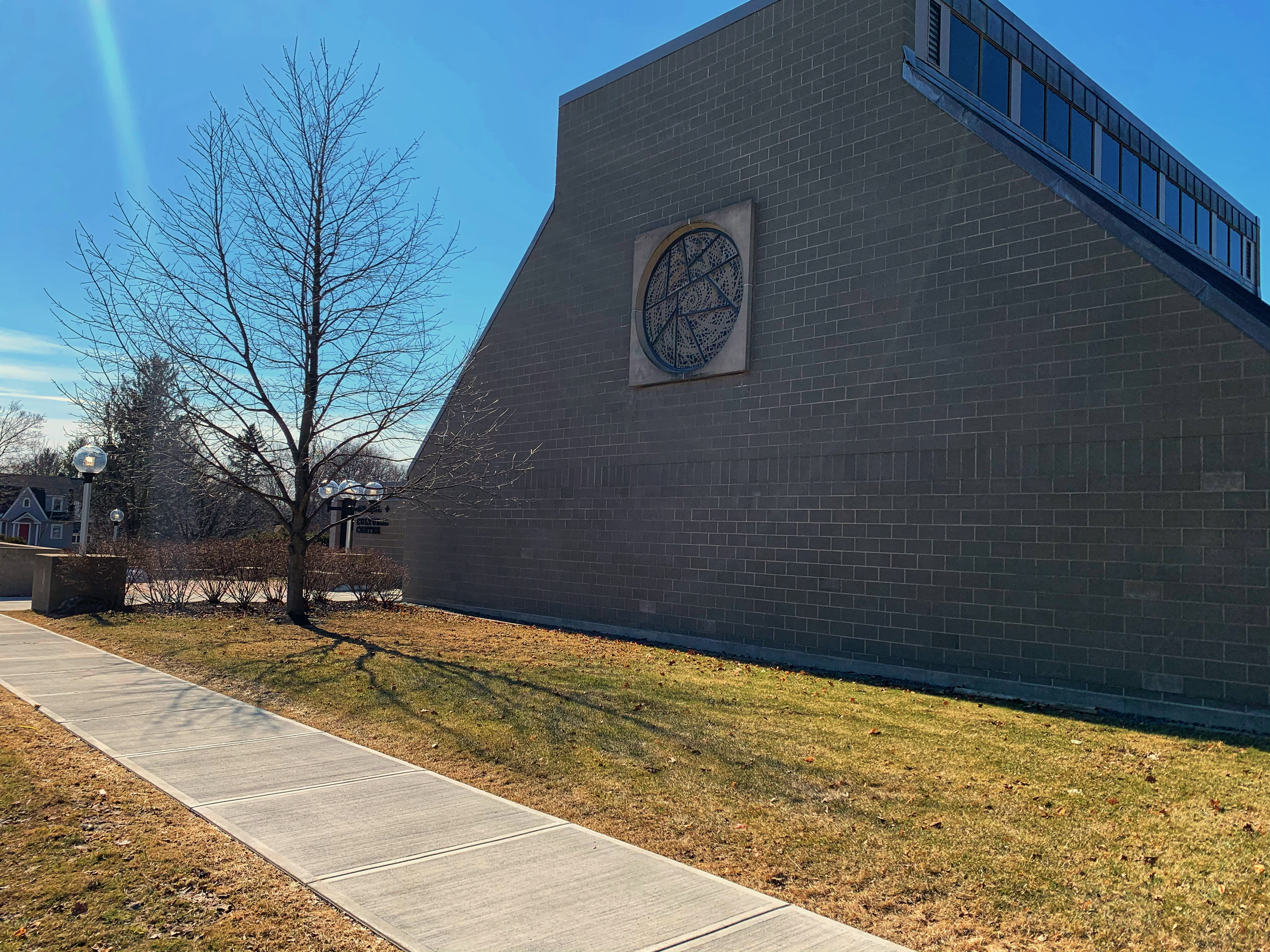
- Christ Sun of Justice
- Location: 2215 Burdett Avenue; Troy, New York
- Country: United States
- Denomination: Catholic
- Website: rensselaernewman.org/ccc/

History
- Status: Active
- Founded: 1907
- Consecrated: 1970

Administration
- Province: New York
- Diocese: Albany

Clergy
- Bishop: Edward Bernard Scharfenberger
- Priest(s): Jordan Lenaghan, OP
- Chapel and Cultural Center
- U.S. National Register of Historic Places
- Location within New York
- NRHP reference No.: 11000041
- Added to NRHP: February 22, 2011

The Chapel + Cultural Center at Rensselaer (/ˈrɛnsəˌliər/ REN-sə-LEER) is an architecturally unique, multipurpose performing arts and spiritual space in Troy, New York. The Center is owned and operated by the Rensselaer Newman Foundation (RNF). It is conventionally referred to as "The C+CC"; the "+" sign has come to be formally used instead of "and" or an ampersand as a representative symbol of the Christian cross. While located on the campus of Rensselaer Polytechnic Institute (RPI), the C+CC is managed and operated as an independent organizational entity. The C+CC provides a home to the Catholic University Parish of Christ Sun of Justice. Its staff members offer administrative support for chaplaincy services at RPI for the Catholic, Protestant, Jewish, and Muslim communities.

== Early history ==
The Roman Catholic Church at RPI began as a Newman Association with a faculty advisor in 1907. ("Newman Associations" and "Newman Centers" are often used to designate Catholic campus ministry centers at state and other non-Catholic universities; they take their names from Cardinal Newman). In 1914, a part-time chaplain was assigned to RPI by the Bishop of the Roman Catholic Diocese of Albany. In 1936, Monsignor William M. Slavin was appointed as the first Resident Catholic Chaplain at RPI, serving the entire campus community. He was succeeded in that position by Reverend Thomas W. Phelan in 1959.

In the early 1960s, the issue of a permanent home became more pressing when the chapel of the Convent of the Good Shepherd was sold to RPI, leaving the Catholic community without a regular worship space. A petition was filed with the State of New York to incorporate a nonprofit organization to support fundraising for and operation of an independent facility. On November 22, 1963, the Regents of the University of the State of the New York chartered the Rensselaer Newman Foundation (RNF) as an educational corporation. The RNF's founding trustees were Martin F. Davis, William A. Kerrigan, John I. Millet (Board President), Monsignor William M. Slavin and Reverend Thomas W. Phelan. The purposes of the corporation as stated on its charter were:

a. To establish and maintain non-degree courses in theology, philosophy and related subjects;

b. To foster and provide extracurricular programs for Catholic Students attending Rensselaer Polytechnic Institute;

c. To foster and provide scholarships, fellowships and other student aids; and

d. To foster and develop the intellectual and moral life of Catholic students through religious education, cultural activity and social participation.

In 1965 and 1966, the RNF trustees began researching and acquiring land to build a dedicated facility, eventually settling on a series of parcels on Burdett Avenue between Peoples Avenue and Sherry Road in Troy. On December 6, 1966, the RNF Board of Trustees passed a resolution directing its Building Committee, chaired by Stephen E. Wiberley, to develop a final plan for the C+CC. By February 1967, the C+CC design was completed by the architectural firm of Levatich and Miller from Ithaca, New York. In June 1967, Board President John I. Millet signed a construction contract with Corina Construction Company to build the C+CC. The facility opened with a two-week dedication festival in October and November 1968.

In September 1970, the University Parish of Christ Sun of Justice was erected by canonical decree of the Bishop of the Roman Catholic Diocese of Albany. Reverend Thomas W. Phelan was the parish's first pastor, and served in that capacity until 2001, when he was relieved by Reverend Edward S. Kacerguis. (Reverend Phelan also served as RPI's Dean of Humanities and Social Sciences through much of his tenure as pastor). A total of eleven additional Catholic priests have been assigned to the C+CC since Phelan's service began in 1959, as well as six female Resident Catholic Chaplains, and nine non-clerical Directors.

== Building ==
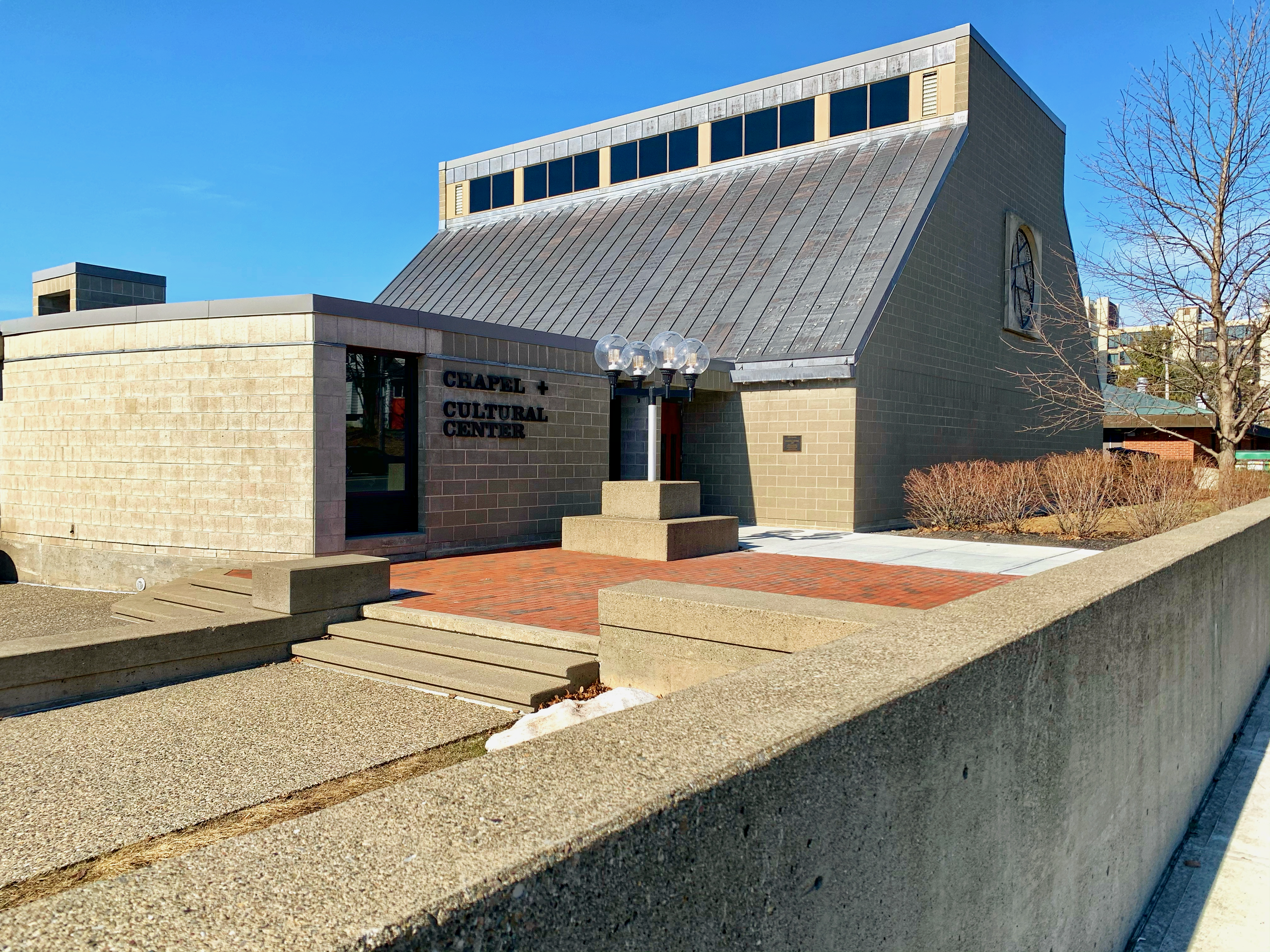
A view of the building from the southeast.

The C+CC was conceived and designed as a functional multi-purpose facility, drawing together the sacred and the secular, religious services and performing arts, educational and social events. By February 1969, nine national and international publications had written major feature articles on the C+CC (including a cover story in The New York Times), praising its unique mixture of utilitarian simplicity (it is an unfinished block building) and functional flexibility. It received the highest award then given for religious buildings by the Liturgical Conference.

A book specifically about the C+CC, Community on Campus (edited by Myron B. Bloy, Jr.) was published in 1971, arguing that the distinct multi-purpose model created by the RNF's founding trustees marked a major milestone in the development of the contemporary Catholic Church in America by fully embracing the Second Vatican Council's liberalization of the liturgy and the role of the Church in the secular world.

The C+CC features a main auditorium that can seat up to 450 people, with movable risers and chairs allowing a variety of configurations for various events. An altar chapel may be connected to or separated from the auditorium via sliding wooden doors. Ade Bethune designed the altar chapel and main auditorium's liturgical features, including the stained glass oculus in the east wall. Father Edward Catich wrote the giant Greek, Roman and Hebrew alphabets painted on the main auditorium's floor. Next to the Bethune oculus hangs a massive fragment of the "Spoil Bank Crucifix" carved by Eric Gill and acquired from the Guild of St Joseph and St Dominic, Sussex, England. The C+CC's permanent collection also includes works by Pablo Picasso, Tomie dePaola, George Nakashima, Edgar Holloway, Larry Kagan, and numerous other contemporary artists, as well as a collection of antique sculpture and liturgical pieces.

A hallway art gallery, lounge and conference room provide space for curated fine art exhibitions and community meetings. A connected rectory provides housing for parish priests and staff; the rectory was named "Slavin House" in honor of Monsignor Slavin. In 1994, a capital campaign was begun to fund building and grounds improvements at the C+CC, and to bring the facility fully into compliance with the Americans with Disabilities Act of 1990.

In October 2003, 19th Street between Sherry Road and Peoples Avenue in Troy was renamed "Tom Phelan Place" in recognition of the RNF/C+CC founder's service to the local community. Reverend Phelan died in April 2006 shortly before his 81st birthday. His Liturgy of Christian Burial was held at the C+CC.

In 2011 the building was added to the National Register of Historic Places.
