= Terlinden =

Noble family

Coat of Arms

The Terlinden family is a Belgian noble family of German origin, with a noble offspring in Belgium. Its titles are Viscount and Baron.

== History ==
At the beginning of the nineteenth century, Charles Terlinden married in Ghent and lived there. His sons, Charles and Prosper Terlinden, settled in Brussels and founded two distinct branches. The first was recognized within Belgian nobility in 1874, the second in 1900. The third son, Jules, also settled in Brussels, did not ask for nobility recognition and had no descendants.

== Genealogy ==
- Cornelius Terlinden († ca. 1535), alderman and mayor of Rheinberg.
  - Thielman Terlinden († ca. 1597), alderman of Rheinberg.
    - Cornelius Terlinden (ca. 1550-1614), x Gertrude Stevens. The couple fled to Antwerp around 1580 in order to remain within the catholic faith. In 1592 they moved to Alost, where Cornelius was active as a brewer and became an alderman in 1610.
      - Imbrecht Terlinden (†1645), brewer, x Jeanne de Smet. They had eleven children.
        - Cornelius Terlinden (ca.1610? - 1691), alderman of Alost, general tax collector for Alost and its region and also for Grammont and its region., x Martine Boële. On 11 November 1676 he was granted nobility.
          - Charles-François Terlinden (1647-1714), x Barbe le Mire (1688-1739), general collector like his father.
            - François-Antoine Terlinden (1704-1765), alderman of Alost, x Françoise de Castaneda y Terran (1706-1746).
              - Jacques-Emmanuel Terlinden (1746-1813), x 1773 Marie-Cornelie Beeckman (1751-1818), with thirteen children. He was alderman of Alost, lord of Uitbergen and, through his wife, owner of the castle and domain of Uitbergen. He chose the side of the revolution of 1788 and organized a regiment of infantry, commanded by his two eldest sons, Jacques and Maximilien. After the French revolutionaries had taken Belgium, nobility was abolished. In 1807 Jacques sold castle and domain to Emmanuel de Kerckhove d'Ousselghem (1767-1854).
                - Charles Terlinden (1794-1868), married in Ghent with Marie-Isabelle de Ghendt (1792-1837) and in 1839 with Françoise de Ghendt (1794-1855). He had been fighting for Napoleon in Leipzig (1813). His did not ask to be recognized within the Belgian nobility, but his sons sons, Charles-Jacques and Prosper, did.
                  - Charles-Jacques Terlinden (1826-1891), see next.
                  - Jules Terlinden (1828-1908), senator, did not ask for nobility recognition.
                  - Prosper Terlinden (1832-1901), see next.

== Charles Terlinden ==
- Charles Jacques Maximilien Terlinden (Ghent, 28 February 1826 - Ixelles, 15 May 1891), became a magistrate and reached the top of the Court of Appeal in Brussels. He married in 1850 in Vinderhoute with Marie Blancqaert (1830-1920). They had three sons and a daughter. In 1874 he was granted recognition within the hereditary nobility of Belgium.
  - Georges Terlinden (1851-1947), procureur-général at the Cour the Cassation, received in 1921 the title viscount. In 1877 he married in Schaerbeek Thérèse Eenens (1857-1912), daughter of Alexis Eenens, Member of Parliament. They had five sons and a daughter.
    - Viscount Charles-Alexis Terlinden (1878-1972), historian and professor at the Catholic University of Louvain. In 1906 he married in Ixelles with Marguerite Orban de Xivry (1885-1912), daughter of senator Edmond Orban de Xivry, and in 1915 in Ghent, Elisabeth Verhaegen (1889-1982), daughter of Arthur Verhaegen, member of parliament. He had two sons and a daughter with his first wife and five sons and a daughter with his second wife.
      - Viscount Charles-Emmanuel Terlinden (1907-2005), president of the tribunal in Louvain, married in Leuven, in 1932, Marie Poullet (1909-2005), daughter of viscount Prosper Poullet, Belgian prime minister. They had seven daughters and three sons, with descendants until today.
        - Viscount Charles-Albert Terlinden (1935-1996), x Nicole Melot (divorce in 1978), xx Chantal Roegiers.
          - Viscount Charles-Henri Terlinden (°1967) chairman of the Family-association, executive director & chief risk officer at Bpost Bank, x Ann-Michèle Verheyden, with descendants until today.
      - Pierre-Edmond Terlinden (1908-1999), married in 1930 in Paris, Suzanne-Marie Hye de Crom (1901-2000), without descendants.
      - Jacqueline Terlinden (1912-2007), married count Ludovico Ruffo di Calabria (1885-1952), uncle of Queen Paola of Belgium, without descendants.
      - Etienne Terlinden (1916-2005), married in 1940 in Brussels with Elisabeth Pouppez de Kettenis de Hollaeken (1920-2010). They had three sons and a daughter, with descendants until today.
      - Jean Terlinden (1917-2015), president of the Court of Appeal in Brussels, married in 1944 (divorce 1961) in Ixelles, Françoise Calmeyn (1920-2008), and in 1977 Marie-Gabrielle de Diesbach Belleroche (1943-1999). He had a son and two daughters of his first marriage, with no further male descendants. During the Second World War he was a member of the Resistance group Zero.
      - André Terlinden (1920-1983), civil ingeneer, married in 1949 (divorce in 1973) in Etterbeek, Madeleine de Woot de Trixhe (1927-2017), and in 1973 in Uccle, Colette Nothomb (1922-2013), daughter of senator Pierre Nothomb. He had a son and two daughters of hij first marriage.
      - Claire Terlinden (1923-2022), married in 1947 in Ixelles, chevalier Hugues de Pierpont (1917-2004). They had six sons, with descendants until now.
      - Jacques Terlinden (1927-2011), married in 1952, Myriam de le Court. They had two sons and three daughters, with descendants until today.
    - Georges Terlinden (1879-1912), married in 1902 in Pepinster, viscountess Madeleine Davignon (1881-1962), daughter of Julien Davignon, senator, MP, minister of Foreign Affairs. They had a son and two daughters, with descendants until today.
      - Philippe Terlinden (1906-1978), married in 1946 in Ixelles, Nadejda Maltzoff (1915-2011). They had two sons and a daughter, with descendants until today. In 1925 he was made a baron.
    - Marthe Terlinden (1881-1978), married in 1906 in Schaarbeek, baron Gaston de Bethune (1877-1966). They had two sons and three daughters, amongst them Ade Bethune, with descendants until today.
    - Jacques Terlinden (1885-1978), lieutenant-general, married in 1924 in Brussels, Germaine Ectors (1894-1970), daughter of Jacques Ectors and Clotilde Van Hoorde, granddaughter of senator Felix Ectors. They had two sons and two daughters, with descendants until today. He was made a baron in 1925.
      - Maximilien Terlinden (1927-2016), baron, colonel, married in 1956 in Uccle, Geneviève Van der Rest (1935-2002), granddaughter of Maurice Van der Rest, president of the Central Committee of Industry and the Union of Belgian Industry. They had five sons and two daughters, with descendants until today.
        - Thérèse Terlinden (1957- ), married with Marc Wauters. She is the founder of Les petits belges, an association for young Belgians with foreign roots.
        - Jacques Terlinden (1958), baron, civil ingeneer, married Anne Jonckheere. They had a son and two daughters, with descendants until today.
        - Etienne Terlinden (1965- ), cisterciëns oblate.
        - Luc Terlinden (1968- ), archbishop for the archdiocese of Malines-Brussels, primate of the Catholic Church in Belgium.
      - Michel (1929-2002), x Gwennolée le Gentil de Rosmorduc (1933- ). He was colonel-aviator, professor at the Military School, founder of the Friends of the Air Museum and president of the Société royale de Philantropie. They had two sons and two daughters, with descendants until today.
    - André Terlinden (1888-1945), baron, civil ingeneer, chief of staff for the Minister of Finances, married in 1917 in La Membrolle-sur-Choisille, Madeleine Hainguerlot (1895-1964). They had four sons and five daughters, with descendants until today. In 1925 he was made a baron.
      - Georges Terlinden (1919-1983), colonel-aviator, married Thérèse Van der Linden (1925-2009), with descendants until today.
      - Jacqueline Terlinden (1921-1964) x general Jean Compagnon (1916-2011). After her early death he married Sylvie Palewski, daughter of Member of Parliament Jean-Paul Palewski (1898-1976).
        - Antoine Compagnon (1950- ), author, professor of the Collège de France, member of the Académie Française (2022).
      - François Terlinden (1938-2007), architect-urbanist, co-founder of the Archives et Musée de l'Architecture, restaurator of the Museum of Instruments, married Francine de Potter (1939-2005).
    - Étienne Terlinden (1891-1914), sollicitor, died for Belgium, in Duffel on 5 oktober 1914.
  - Oscar Terlinden (1853-1916), general-major.
  - Marie Terlinden (1856-1953) x chevalier Philippe de Wouters de Bouchout (1857-1935), mayor of Roosbeek-Neerbutsel. They had four sons and six daughters, with descendants until today.
  - Paul Terlinden (1858-1935), sollicitor, member of parliament, mayor of Rixensart, married in 1883 in Saint-Gilles, Valentine Bosquet (1862-1941). They had three sons and a daughter, with no further descendants.

== Prosper Terlinden ==
- Prosper Marie Edouard Eugène Terlinden (Ghent, 15 April 1832 - Malines, 23 February 1901), lieutenant-colonel, was recognized in 1900 as a member of the Belgian heredetary nobility. He married in 1866 in Brussels, Alix Pieters (1844-1922).
  - Edmond Terlinden (1884-1925), major, married in 1911 in Alost, baroness Paule de Bethune (1890-1968).
    - Guy Terlinden (1913-2000), was made a baron in 1971, married in 1935, Marie de Cartier d'Yves (1914-1974), with descendants until today.
    - Leon Terlinden (1916-1997), made a baron in 1971, was squadron leader of the Royal Air Force and married in 1944 (divorce in 1979) in London, Evelyn Bardach (1918-1985) and in 1979 in Vancouver, Larissa Gorenko (1918-2003). He had six children, with descendants until today.
    - Robert Terlinden (1921-1999), made a baron in 1971, director-general of the Groupe Bruxelles Lambert, President Compagnie Urbaine UAP, married in 1950 in Porto, Adelaïde de Almeida Ventura (1920-2016), with descendants until today.
      - Bernard Terlinden (1954- ), married Catherine Jolly, daughter of viscount Reginald Jolly, with descendants until today.
      - Christian Terlinden (1959- ), married Sophie van Yperseele de Strihou, daughter of baron Hervé van Yperseele de Strihou, with descendants until today.

== Sources and literature ==
- Généalogie Terlinden, in: Annuaire de la noblesse de Belgique, Brussels, 1862.
- Note on the family Terlinden, 1908.
- Oscar COOMANS DE BRACHÈNE, Généalogie Terlinden, in: État présent de la noblesse belge, Brussel, Annuaires 1968, 1982, 1999.
- Angelique D'OULTREMONT, Le vicomte Terlinden, in: Bulletin Association de la noblesse belge (ANRB), n°110.
- L'installation de Mr. Jean Terlinden, conseiller à la cour d'appel de Bruxelles, in: Bulletin ANRB, n° 111.
- H. HAAG, Vicomte Charles Terlinden, in: Nouvelle biographie nationale de Belgique, T. III, Brussel, 1984.
- Michel TERLINDEN, Au service des ailes. Léon baron Terlinden, in: Bulletin ANRB n° 213 1998.
- Marie-Pierre D'UDEKEM D'ACOZ, Voor Koning en Vaderland. De Belgische Adel in het Verzet, Tielt, Lannoo, 2003.
- Humbert DE MARNIX DE SAINTE ALDEGONDE, État présent de la noblesse belge, Annuaire 2013, Brussel, 2013.
