= Agnes Mary Webster =

British artist (born 1856)

Agnes Mary Clausen
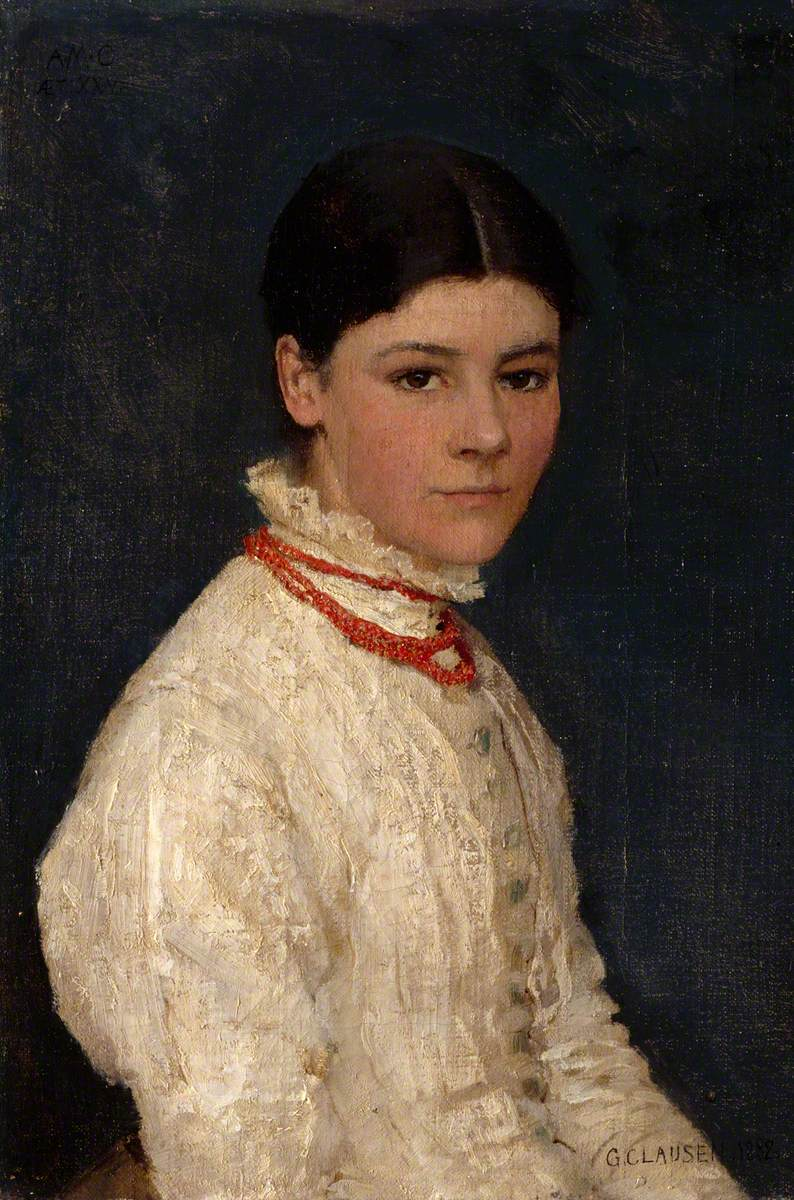
- Portrait of Clausen by her husband
- Born: Agnes Mary Webster; 27 November 1856; King's Lynn, Norfolk, England
- Died: 4 March 1944 (aged 87); Cold Ash, Newbury, Berkshire
- Spouse: George Clausen
- Relatives: Alfred George Webster (brother), Katharine Clausen (daughter)

Agnes Mary Webster also known as Agnes M. Clausen (27 November 1856 – 4 March 1944) was an English painter and etcher.

== Life ==
Agnes Mary Webster was born in King's Lynn, Norfolk on 27 November 1856. She trained at the South Kensington Schools in London.

Through her brother, Alfred George Webster (1852-1916), she met fellow student, George Clausen. Webster and Clausen married on 1 June 1881. After they married, the couple moved to Childwick Green, Hertfordshire. They had two daughters, Katharine Frances Clausen O'Brien who also became an artist, and Margaret, who married the artist Thomas Derrick, and three sons. One of their sons, Hugh (1888-1972), worked as an engineer in the Admiralty. Webster often modelled for her husband in his paintings.

In 1888, she published and illustrated a children's book of verse, Daisy Days. Webster exhibited with the Royal Society of British Artists, Royal Institute of Painters in Water Colours, and the Walker Art Gallery. Examples of her work is held in the Royal Academy London.

Webster died on 4 March 1944 after a long illness at her home in Cold Ash, Newbury, Berkshire, where she and her husband had moved during World War II.
