= George Clausen =

British artist (1852–1944)

Sir George Clausen RA RWS RI ROI
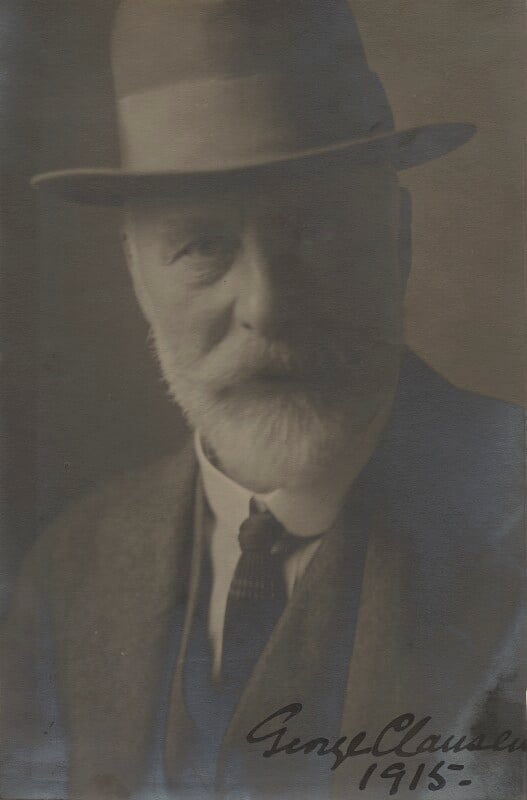
- Clausen, c. 1915
- Born: 18 April 1852; London, England
- Died: 22 November 1944 (aged 92); Thatcham, Berkshire, England
- Education: South Kensington Schools; Académie Julian
- Known for: Founding member of NEAC; painting; watercolour; oils
- Movement: British impressionism; British War Art; Rural naturalism
- Spouse: Agnes Mary Webster
- Elected: ARI 1876; RI 1879; ROI 1883; NEAC 1886 (founding member); ARWS 1889; RWS 1898; ARA 1895; RA 1908; HonRBA 1923; RSW 1926; HonSGA

Sir George Clausen RA RWS RI ROI (18 April 1852 – 22 November 1944) was a British artist working in oil and watercolour, etching, mezzotint, drypoint and occasionally lithographs. He was knighted in 1927.

== Biography ==
George Clausen was born at 8 William Street in the Regents Park district of London on 18 April 1852, the son of a decorative artist of Danish descent and a Scottish mother. From 1867 to 1873, he attended design classes at the South Kensington Schools in London with great success. He then worked in the studio of Edwin Long RA and subsequently in Paris under Bouguereau and Tony Robert-Fleury at the Académie Julian. He was an admirer of the naturalism of the painter Jules Bastien-Lepage about whom he wrote in 1888 and 1892.

Clausen married fellow artist, Agnes Mary Webster, on 1 June 1881. They had two daughters, Katharine Frances Clausen O'Brien who also became an artist, and Margaret, who married the artist Thomas Derrick, and three sons. One of their sons, Hugh (1888-1972), worked as an engineer in the Admiralty.

Clausen became one of the foremost modern painters of landscape and of peasant life, influenced to a certain extent by the Impressionists, with whom he shared the view that light is the real subject of landscape art. His pictures excel in rendering the appearance of things under flecking outdoor sunlight, or in the shady shelter of a barn or stable. His Girl at the Gate was acquired by the Chantrey Trustees and is now at the Tate Gallery. The Yale Center for British Art holds Clausen's Schoolgirls (1880), an urban scene, which it featured in its exhibit called "Britain in the World: 1860-Now."

Other landscapes included "The Fields in June" (1914) and "Midsummer Dawn" (1921). For the Imperial War Museum he painted the large, broadly decorative, "Gun Factory at Woolwich Arsenal" (1919). His decorative work also included "Renaissance" (1915) and decorations for the Hall at High Royd, Huddersfield, consisting of life-size figures in lunettes.

Clausen was a founding member of the New English Art Club in 1886. In 1895, he was elected an Associate of the Royal Academy, and a full Academician in 1906. He was elected as the Master of the Art Workers' Guild in 1909. As Professor of Painting at the Royal Academy he gave a memorable series of lectures to the students of the Schools, published as Six Lectures on Painting (1904) and Aims and Ideals in Art (1906).

Clausen was an official war artist during World War I. During the war his daughter's fiancé (Second Lieutenant Geraint Payne) was killed; this event may have inspired his painting, Youth Mourning which shows a distressed young woman mourning in a desolate landscape. Clausen also contributed six lithographs on the theme Making Guns for the Government published print portfolio Britain's Efforts and Ideals.

In 1921 Clausen was an original Society of Graphic Art member and showed his work in their first exhibition.

He died at home in the village of Cold Ash in 1944 and was buried there next to his wife in the parish churchyard.

== Gallery ==
Selected works

Spring Morning, Haverstock Hill, 1881

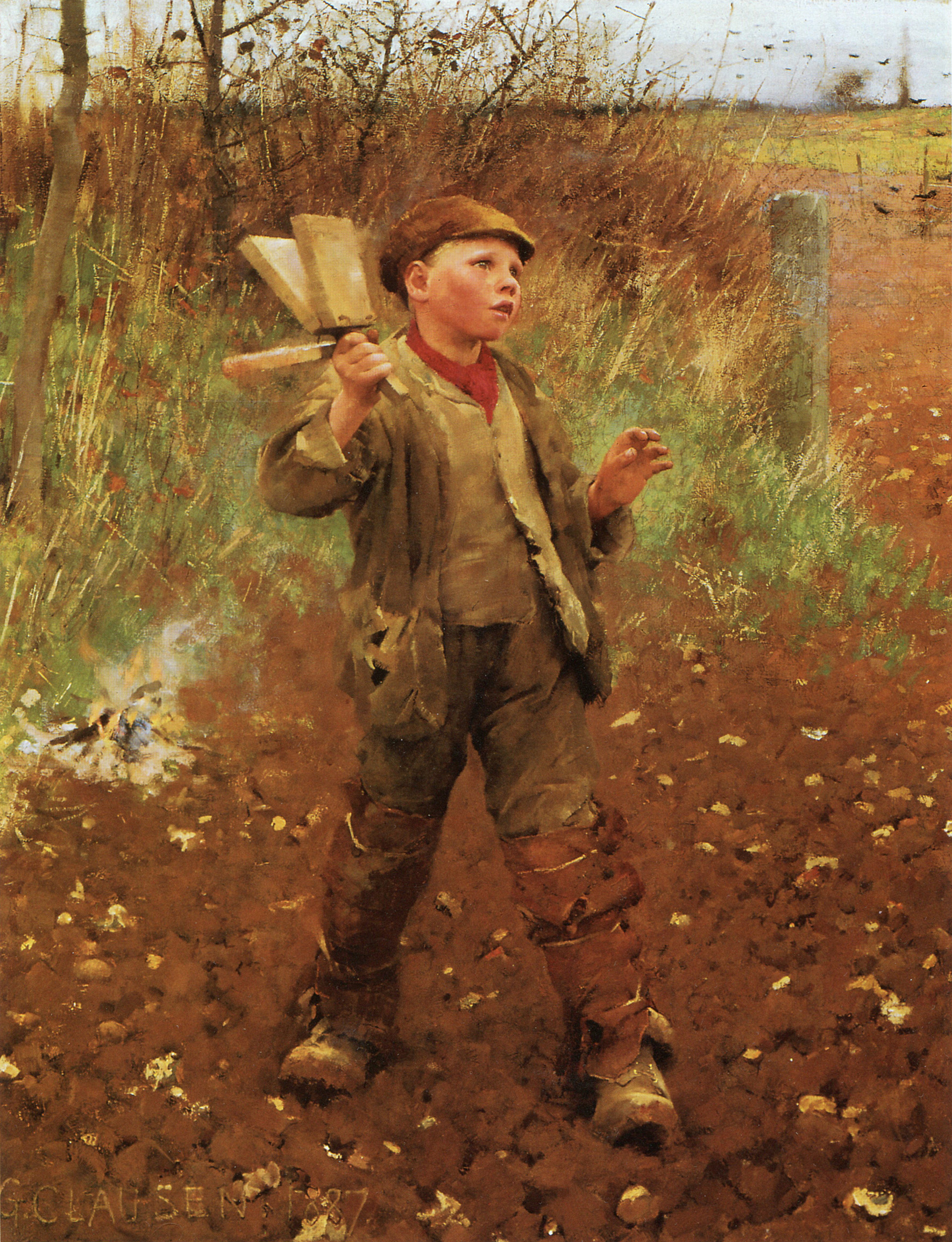
Bird scaring, 1887

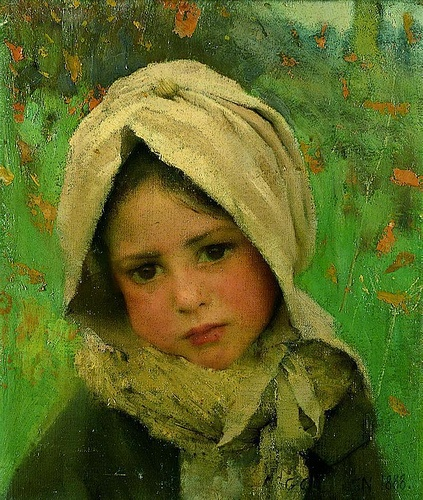
Girl, 1888

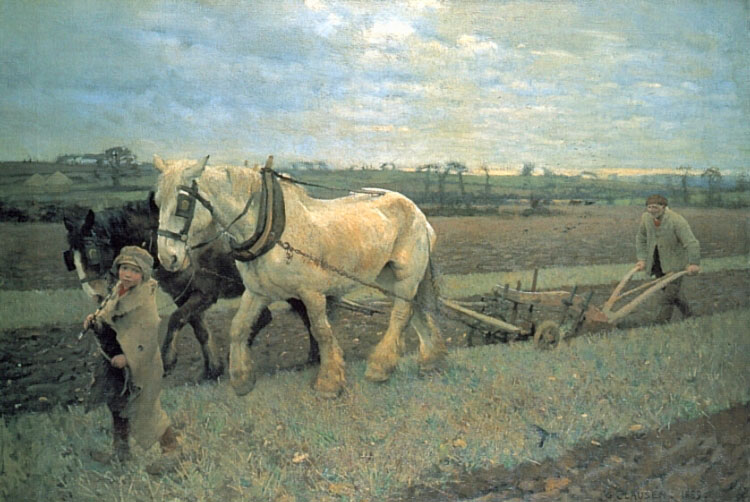
Ploughing, 1889

The Girl at the Gate, 1889

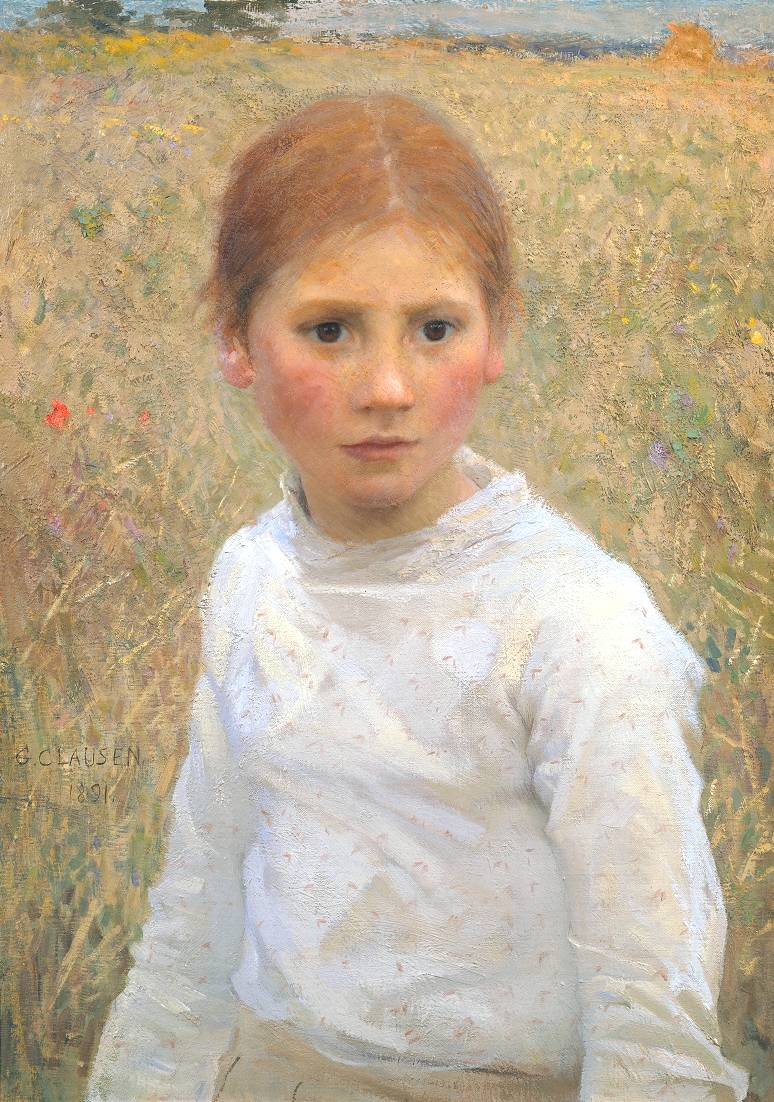
Brown eyes, 1891

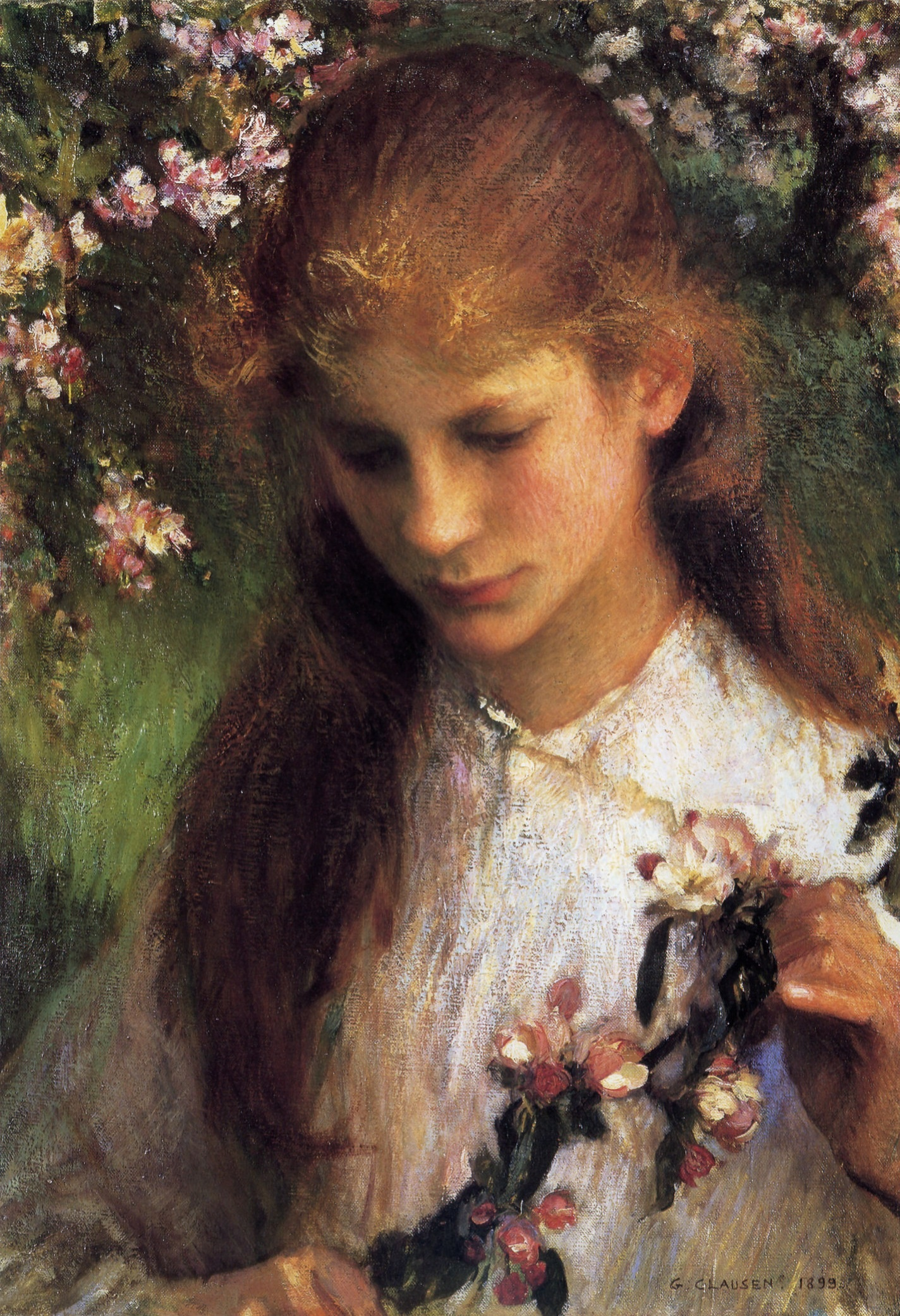
Apple blossom

The Golden Barn, 1901

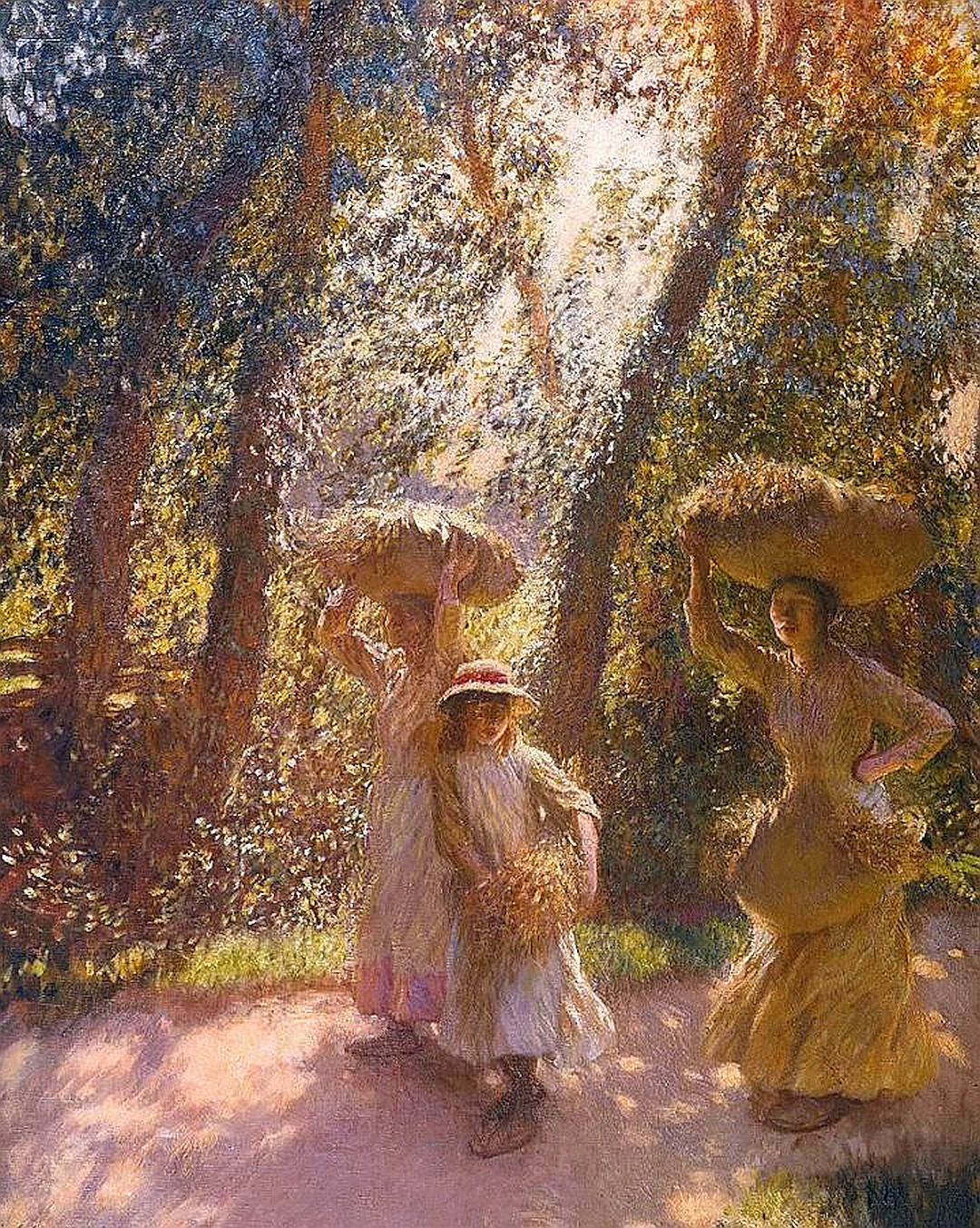
The Gleaners Returning, 1908

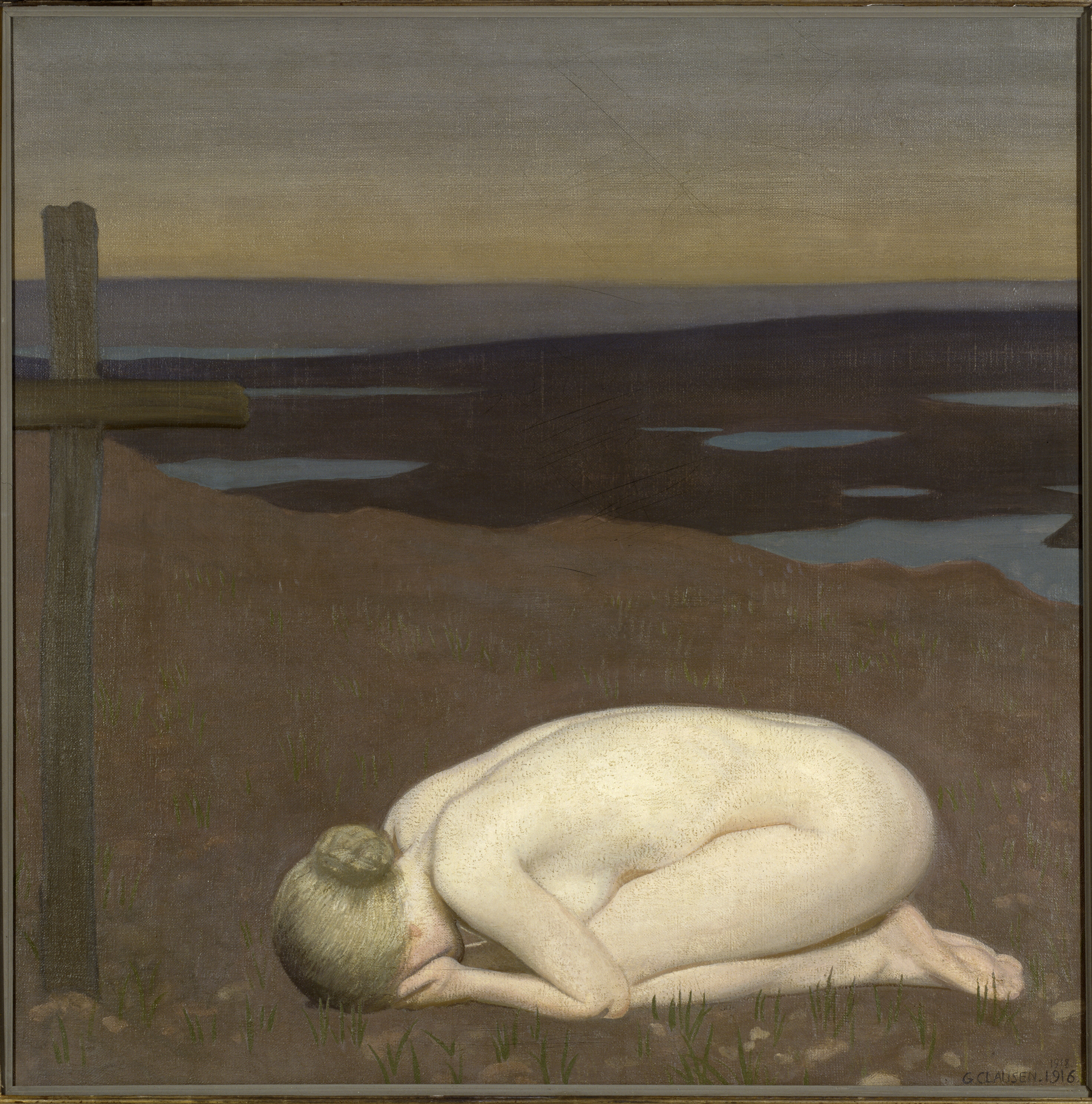
Youth Mourning, 1916

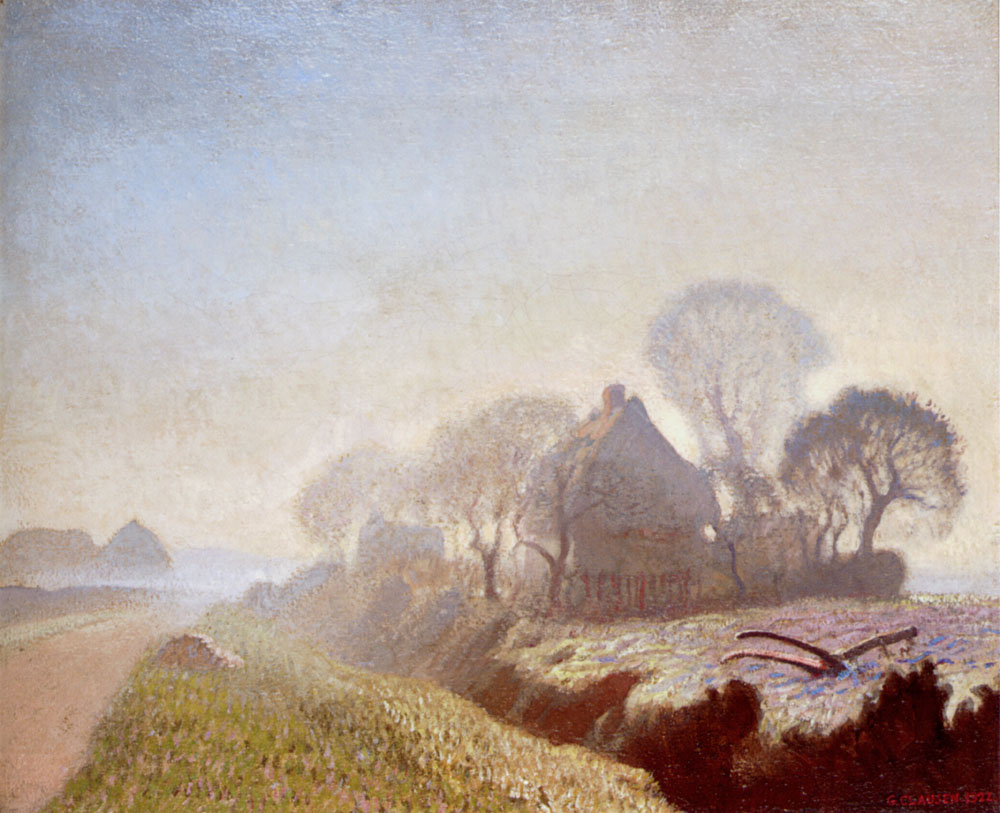
Morning in November, 1922

== Sources ==
- Gibson, Frank. The Etchings and Lithographs of George Clausen, R.A. The Print Collector's Quarterly 1921 July Vol 8, No. 2, pp 203, 212.
- Gibson, Frank. Notes to Catalogue of Etchings by George Clausen The Print Collector's Quarterly 1921 Dec Vol 8, No. 4, p 433.
- Rutherson, Albert (editor). Contemporary British Artists: George Clausen Publisher: Ernest Benn Ltd, 1923
- Sir George Clausen, R.A. 1852–1944; Bradford Art Gallery, 1980. Catalogue of an exhibition held in Bradford, London, Bristol and Newcastle upon Tyne in 1980.
