= Michael Derrick =

British journalist

- Born: 3 January 1915
- Died: 5 August 1961 (aged 46)
- Education: Douai School
- Occupations: editor, journalist, translator
- Notable credit(s): The Tablet, Dublin Review, L'Osservatore Romano
- Spouse: Anneliese Burkhardt
- Children: two sons
- Relatives: Christopher Derrick (brother)
- Family: son of Thomas Derrick

John Michael Derrick (3 January 1915 – 5 August 1961) was a leading figure in Roman Catholic journalism in mid-20th-century England.

== Life ==
Derrick was the son of the cartoonist Thomas Derrick, and older brother of the writer Christopher Derrick. John Derrick was raised in rural Berkshire County in England and attended the Douai School in Woolhampton.

As a young man, Derrick entered the University of Oxford, On a school holiday in Hungary, Derrick became incapacitated by a severe gastroenteritis that took several years of recovery. During his convalescence, he wrote The Portugal of Salazar (1938), a sympathetic study of the Corporatist regime of dictator António de Oliveira Salazar in Portugal.

In 1938, Derrick was hired as an assistant editor of The Tablet. He worked for the magazine until his death, throughout the period of the weekly newspaper's greatest prestige. He frequently wrote the editorial "Notebook" column.

In 1956, Derrick also became the editor of the Dublin Review, Derrick also wrote pamphlets for the Catholic Truth Society and for Sword of the Spirit, and translated a number of books on Catholic subjects. Derrick was Chairman of the Challoner Club, and from 1958 Secretary of the Catholic Union of Great Britain. He stood as the Liberal candidate for Reading North in the 1950 election, losing to the Labour candidate.

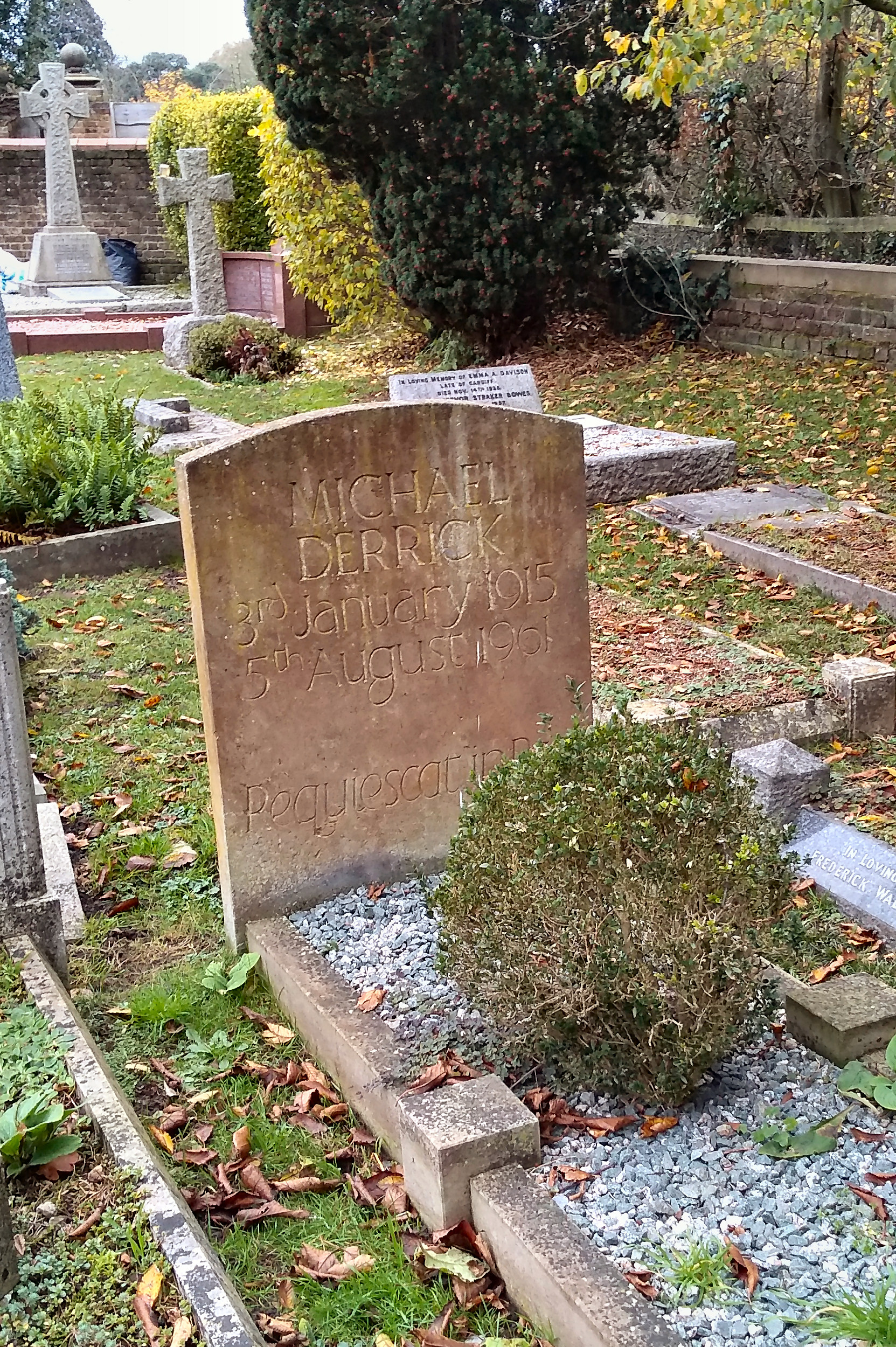
Grave in St Peter's Church, Petersham

In 1951, Derrick married Anneliese Burkhardt, and the couple moved to Petersham. They had two sons.

For a few months before his death, Derrick served as the London correspondent of L'Osservatore Romano. On 29 July 1961, Derrick fell seriously ill. He died on 5 August 1961, a few hours after receiving the viaticum.

== Publications ==
=== Books ===
- The Portugal of Salazar. London: Sands; Paladin Press, 1938.

=== Pamphlets and essays ===
- A guerra e a aliança luso-britânica. Lisboa: Bertrand, 1940.
- Eastern Catholics under Soviet Rule. London: Sword of the Spirit and The Tablet, 1946.
- Cardinal Mindszenty. Sword Pamphlet. London: Richard Madley, [1948].
- 'The Treasonable Clerks of 1848', Dublin Review 442 (1948), pp. 49–67.
- Persecution in Poland. London: Sword of the Spirit, [1953].
- Tito and the Catholic Church. With a foreword by Cardinal Griffin. London: Sword of the Spirit, [1953].
- Spain and Colombia: the Position of Protestants. London: Catholic Truth Society, [1955].
- Pope John XXIII. London: Catholic Truth Society, 1958.
- 'Epilogue' to Zsolt Aradi, John XXIII, Pope of the Council. London: Burns & Oates, [1961].

=== Books edited or translated ===
- Lu Zhengxiang, Ways of Confucius and of Christ, tr. Michael Derrick. London: Burns & Oates, 1948.
- Nazareno Padellaro, Portrait of Pius XII, tr. Michael Derrick etc. London: J. M. Dent & Sons, 1956.
- Wladimir d'Ormesson, The Papacy, tr. Michael Derrick. Faith and Fact Books no. 80. London: Burns & Oates, 1959.
- René Metz, What is Canon Law?, tr. Michael Derrick. Faith and Fact Books no. 79. London: Burns & Oates, 1960.
- William Eric Brown, The Catholic Church in South Africa: from its origins to the present day, ed. Michael Derrick. London: Burns & Oates, 1960.
