= The Girl at the Gate =

Painting by George Clausen

- Artist: George Clausen
- Year: 1889
- Type: Oil on canvas, genre painting
- Dimensions: 171.4 cm × 138.4 cm (67.5 in × 54.5 in)
- Location: Tate Britain, London

The Girl at the Gate is an 1889 oil painting by the British artist George Clausen. It was produced at Cookham Dean in Berkshire where Clausen was then living and depicts the nursemaid to the family's children beside a cottage. Two older villagers are shown in the background.Clausen's work reflects the influence of the rural Realism of Jules Bastien-Lepage. By showing the lone, pensive girl it responded to Lepage's Joan Of Arc Listening To The Voices.

The painting was displayed at the Grosvenor Gallery Exhibition of 1890 held at New Bond Street in London, the final edition held by the fashionable gallery once closely associated with the Aesthetic Movement. Today it is part of the collection of the Tate Britain, having been acquired for the nation through the Chantrey Bequest in 1890.

== Bibliography ==
- Denney, Colleen. At the Temple of Art: The Grosvenor Gallery, 1877-1890 . Fairleigh Dickinson University Press, 2000.
- Herrmann, Luke. Nineteenth Century British Painting. Charles de la Mare, 2000.
