= Esther Newport =

American painter (1901–1986)

Sister Esther Newport, S.P.
- Born: Catherine Newport; May 17, 1901; Clinton, Indiana
- Died: July 9, 1986 (aged 85); Saint Mary-of-the-Woods, Indiana
- Education: Saint Mary-of-the-Woods College, School of the Art Institute of Chicago, Syracuse University
- Known for: painting, sculpting, art education

Sister Esther Newport, S.P., (1901–1986) was an American painter, sculptor, and art educator who founded the Catholic Art Association and served as the founding editor of the Christian Social Art Quarterly.

== Biography ==
She was born Catherine Newport in Clinton, Indiana, to parents Edward and Cora Sams Newport. Newport entered the Sisters of Providence of Saint Mary-of-the-Woods in 1918 at the age of 17, taking the religious name Sister Esther. A main ministry for many years was teaching middle school and art; in 1930 she began a 34-year stint in the art department of Saint Mary-of-the-Woods College. After two years at Marywood School in Evanston, Illinois, she returned to Saint Mary-of-the-Woods College in 1966 and served as head of the art department there until 1970.

== Education ==
After general studies at Saint Mary-of-the-Woods College in the 1920s, Newport earned a bachelor's degree from the School of the Art Institute of Chicago in 1932. Beginning in 1936 she attended Syracuse University with a major in painting and minor in ceramic sculpture, earning her MFA in 1939. For her work in the field of religious art, Newport received an honorary doctorate from Saint Mary's College, Notre Dame, in 1956.

== Career ==
=== Catholic Art Association ===
Newport saw a need for improved art education in Catholic schools and for a set of standards regarding ecclesiastical art. She drew up an initial proposal for a Catholic College Art Association that year but did not find much support for the venture. In response to a 1937 Art Digest article on catholic art by Peyton Boswell, the Digest's editor, Newport revisited her idea and sent her proposal to Boswell. He publicized the proposal in his April 1937 column and helped to garner public support for the organization. After enlisting artist Graham Carey as resident philosopher for the group, she founded the Catholic Art Association (CAA) in 1937 and served as its first director. The Association aimed to encourage commissions of religious art by churches and organizations and to educate and elevate Catholic taste. The CAA sponsored exhibitions, conventions, and various publications as well. When the Association began to split severely between art educators (including many teaching sisters and Newport herself) and those more interested in the philosophy of Catholic art (including Graham Carey), Newport left the organization in 1958 and founded the Salve Regina Conference.

==== Catholic Art Quarterly ====
She founded the Christian Social Art Quarterly as the official CAA publication in 1937 (renamed the Catholic Art Quarterly in 1938 and later Good Work) and served as its editor until 1940. The publication, seen as a contemporary of the Catholic Worker and Orate Fratres, centered around the "social character of the arts" for both artists and art educators.

Writers and artists featured in the magazine included Edward Catich, Ade Bethune and C.S. Lewis. Many of Newport's own writings were published within the magazine, including a three-part series on the "Christian Theory of Aesthetics," from 1939 to 1940.

=== Teaching and committee work ===
Newport served as the chairperson of the United States Committee of the Holy Year Exhibit in Rome, 1949–1951. She also directed, and lectured at, summer workshops at the Catholic University of America in the 1950s. Workshop topics included "On Art in the Sister Formation Program" and "Art and Celebration as an Essential Aspect of Christian Living."

== Works and honors ==
"Old Nun" (also called "Contentment"), a winner of the Peter Reilly Award at the Hoosier Salon.

Newport's works include paintings, sculptures and bas relief. She was known for her artistic portrayal of religious subjects; several of her paintings are of Catholic nuns. A two-story bas relief, designed by Newport and executed by Adolph Walter, adorns the facade of the Rooney Memorial Library at Saint Mary-of-the-Woods College.

During her lifetime, Newport exhibited works across the United States, including in the Metropolitan Museum of Art and the Art Students League of New York, as well as in Rome. She was a three-time winner of the Peter Reilly Award at the Hoosier Salon in 1937, 1939, and 1943. In 1974, Newport received first prize in needlework at the International Needlework Show in Chicago.

Newport's writing focused on Christian theories of art and art education, subjects about which she wrote numerous articles for Christian publications including Orate Fratres, the Sower and Catholic School Interests. She also contributed an article on "Art Education" to the New Catholic Encyclopedia.
