= Edward Catich =

American Catholic priest and calligrapher (1906–1979)

The Reverend Edward M. Catich
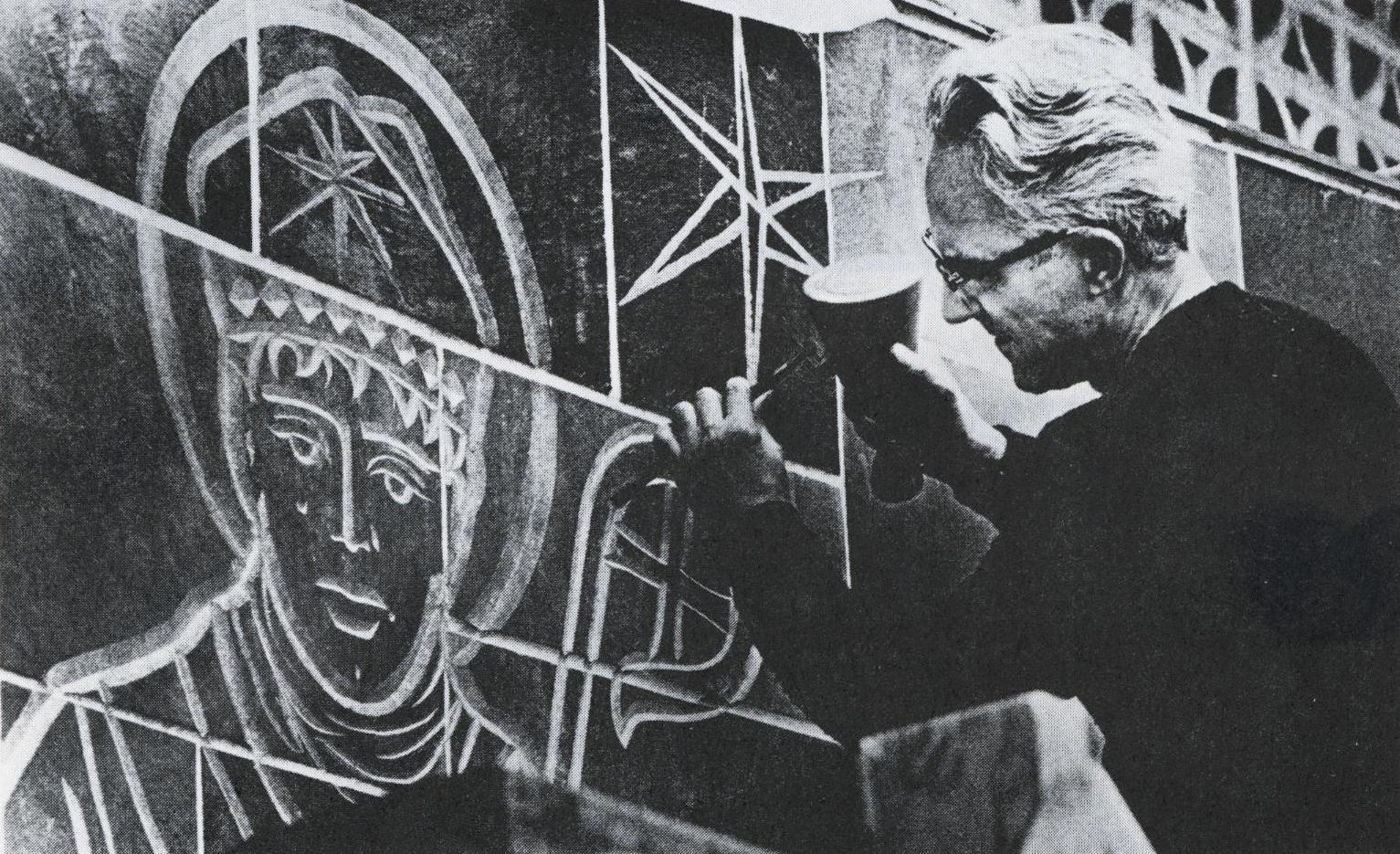
- Catich stonecutting, c. 1976
- Born: January 4, 1906; Stevensville, Montana, US
- Died: April 14, 1979 (aged 73); Davenport, Iowa, US
- Known for: Education, calligraphy

Edward M. Catich (January 4, 1906 – April 13, 1979) was an American Catholic priest, teacher, and calligrapher. He is noted for the fullest development of the thesis that the inscribed Roman square capitals of the Augustan age and afterward owed their form (and their characteristic serifs) wholly to the use of the flat brush, rather than to the exigencies of the chisel or other stone cutting tools.

== Life ==
After his father's death when he was aged 12, Catich and three brothers (including his twin) were taken by train to the orphanage of the Loyal Order of Moose, the Mooseheart campus near Aurora, Illinois. His step-mother Madeline Catich died in 1927.

At the orphanage he apprenticed under sign-writer Walter Heberling. After graduating high school in 1924, Catich toured with a Mooseheart band, and then went to Chicago, where he played music in bands. Catich studied art at the School of the Art Institute of Chicago from 1926 to 1929, and supported himself as a union sign-writer. Catich attended where he worked as the leader of the school band. He received a master's degree in art at University of Iowa in Iowa City. In 1935, Catich traveled to Rome to study at Pontifical Gregorian University for the Catholic priesthood, where he also made a study of archeology and paleography. He was ordained in 1938 for the Diocese of Davenport and returned to Iowa to teach art, math, engineering, and music at St. Ambrose. As a priest, he served in parishes of the Diocese of Peoria, including ones in Atkinson and Hooppole.

Throughout much of the late 1940s and early 1950s, Catich made several trips to Massachusetts to work on his calligraphy with W.A. Dwiggins. It was during these trips that he began to explore deep into the Trajan column that would become his life's work. During the 1950s, 1960s, and even into the 1970s, Catich would make many trips to Rome to explore the Roman capitals.

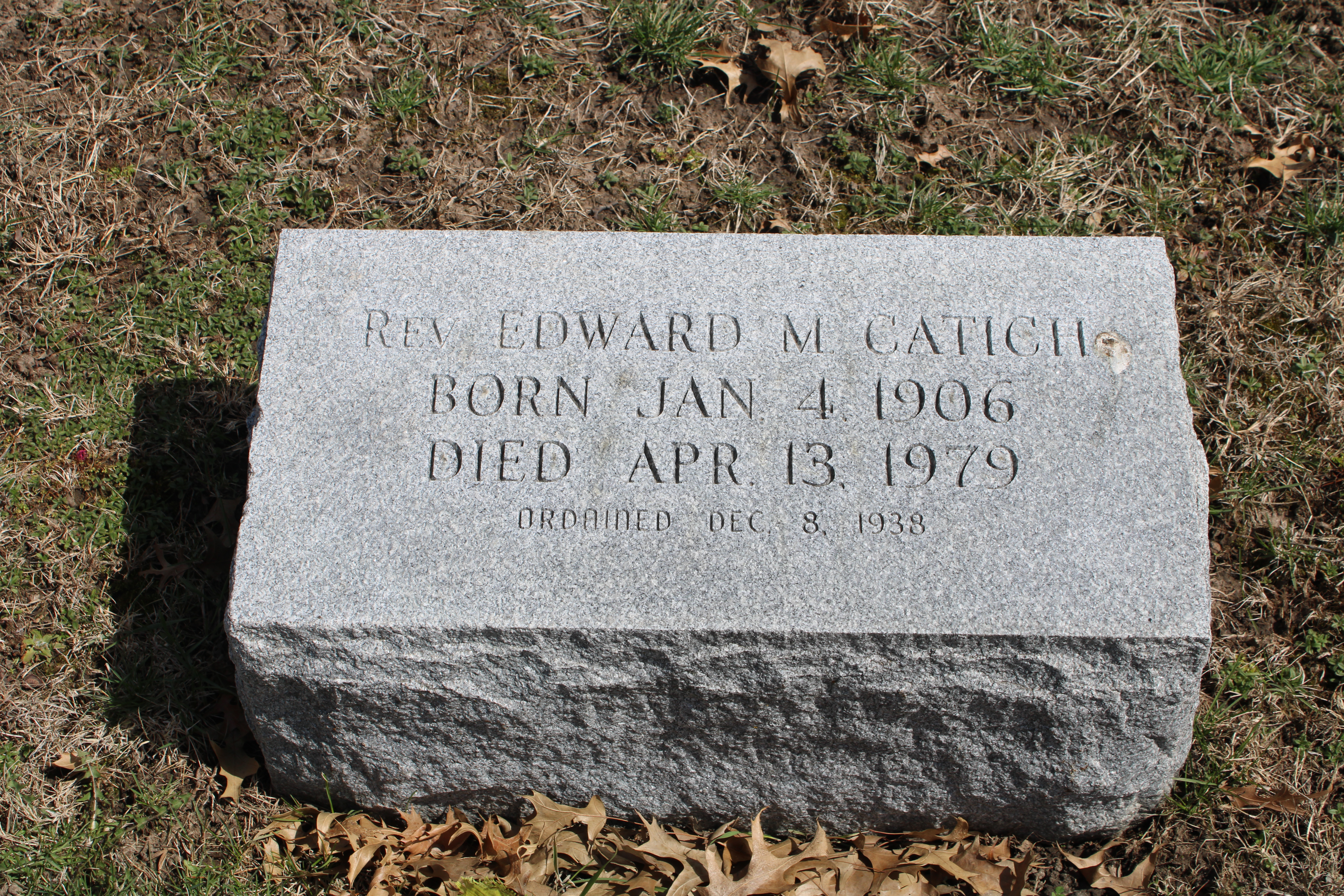
Catich's grave in Mount Calvary Cemetery in Davenport

Catich taught at St. Ambrose for forty years, until his death in 1979. The Davenport, Iowa, university now holds some 4,000 of his works, many from his legacy to Professor John Schmits, housed at the Edward M. Catich Memorial Gallery. The gallery was originally his studio and press at the Galvin Fine Arts Center and was built with a donation from Hallmark Cards, where several of his students worked. In the years following his death, many of Catich's important theories about the Roman Capitals would be adopted.

He had ties to the Los Angeles County Museum of Art, Encyclopædia Britannica, and the Houghton Library at Harvard, and was a founder of the Catholic Art Association.

== Works ==
Art is not freedom from discipline, but disciplined freedom.

— Edward Catich

His calligraphy and stone cutting work won Catich an international reputation, and he created many slate inscriptions using his brush and chisel technique. He created two typefaces, Petrarch and Catfish. Many of his books were published under his own press, The Catfish Press, which operated out of his studio at the university.

Besides calligraphy, Catich was accomplished at liturgical art, working in slate, stained glass, watercolor, and print, and he played the trumpet, cello, and harmonica.

Other institutions which hold his work include:

- Chapel + Cultural Center at Rensselaer
- Harvard College
- Los Angeles County Museum of Art
- Encyclopædia Britannica's corporate headquarters
- Reed College
- Morton Arboretum
- University of Pittsburgh's Cathedral of Learning and Benedum Hall

== The Origin of the Serif ==
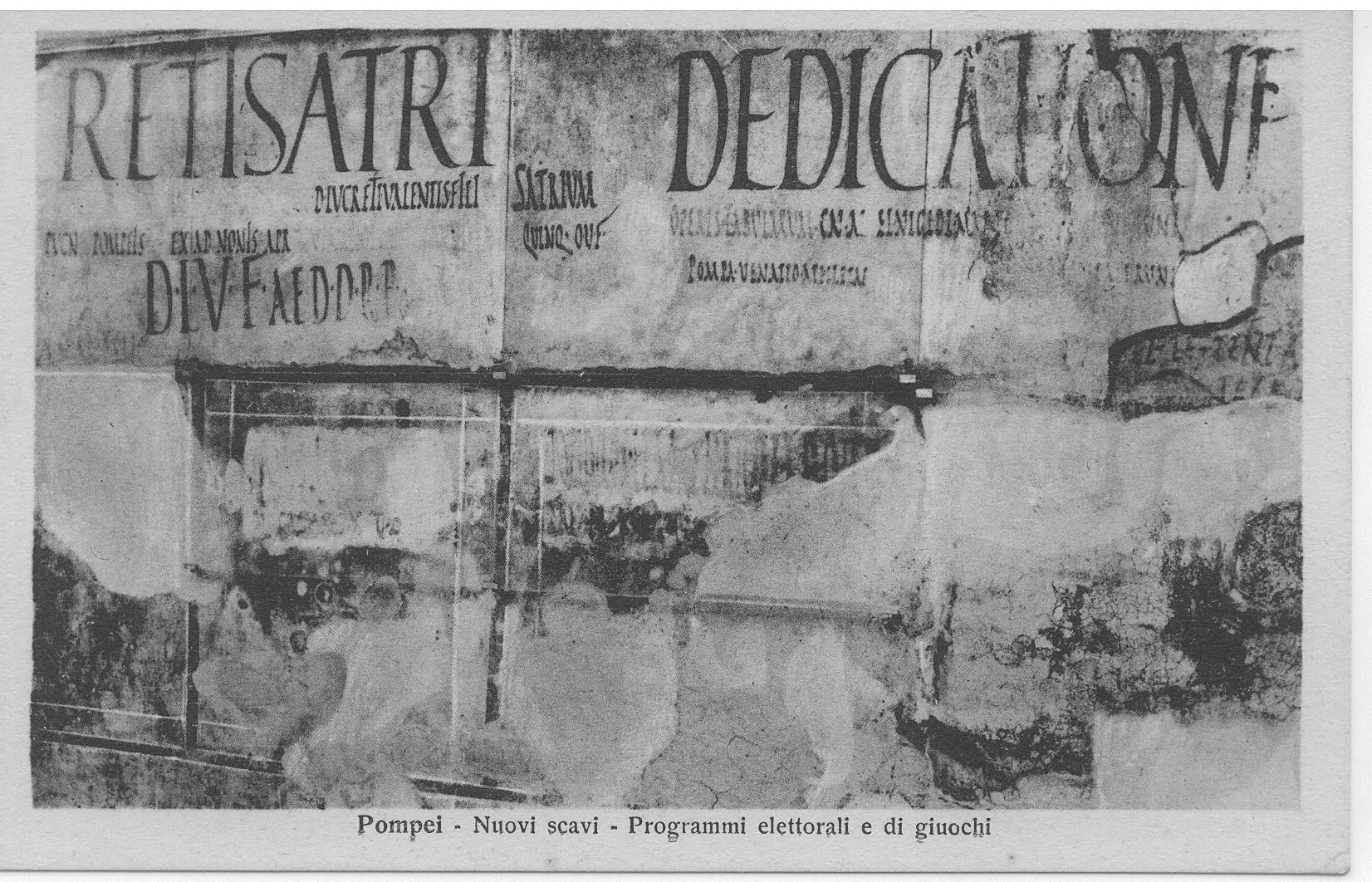
Photograph taken c. 1920 shows graffiti from Pompeii with painted Roman square capitals. Most of the graffiti was destroyed during World War II.

Studying in Rome as a seminarian in the late 1930s, he made a thorough study of the letter forms of the epigraphy on Trajan's Column.

While the brushed-origin thesis had been proposed in the nineteenth century, Catich, having worked as a union sign painter, made a complete study and proposed and proved it's viability with a clearly illustrated strokeplay ductus by which the ancient forms were created, using a flat brush and then chisel. He promulgated his views in two works, Letters Redrawn from the Trajan Inscription in Rome and The Origin of the Serif: Brush Writing and Roman Letters. Both books were created as historic references and practical working manuals, which include a large format set of sequential brush diagrams, and a complete set of brushed exemplar 'Trajan' alphabets.

The thesis has gained increasing recognition from painted lettering specialists across the modern day calligraphic community. It is made most convincing by the existence of hand painted 'sign writing' lettering excavated in Pompeii and in particular the 'graffiti' electioneering posters of the 'Satri wall' which show incised 'filleti' Imperial Roman capital titles (followed by body text in rustic capitals) all of which can only be made by the single, flexion strokes of the flat brush. These letters were brush-painted at speed by highly skilled artists in order to avoid the authorities, on certain walls in burnt sienna red oxide paint. They show how the gradient stem and bar Trajan structure [which has no straight lines] is only achievable by the flexion of the fine flat brush - the reed pen and modern day pencil by contrast are rigid and therefore unable to create this unique flexion characteristic. The Satri wall remains the earliest example, showing an identical 'single stroke' path and structure of the carved lettering of the Trajan column capitals.

== Awards ==
- Eighth Annual Frederick W. Goudy Award, 1976
- Inaugural John McMullen Award

== Selected works ==
- Edward M. Catich. "A Priest Speaks on Chalice-Design." The Catholic Art Quarterly, volume 14, number 2. 1951.
- Edward M. Catich. "Sentimentality in Christian Art" The Furrow 10 (1959)
- Edward M. Catich. Letters Redrawn from the Trajan Inscription in Rome. The Catfish Press, 1961.
- Edward M. Catich. Eric Gill: His social and artistic roots. The Prairie Press, 1964.
- Edward M. Catich. The Origin of the Serif: Brush writing and Roman letters. The Catfish Press, 1968.
- Edward M. Catich. Reed, Pen and Brush: Alphabets for writing and lettering. The Catfish Press, 1972.
- Edward M. Catich. The Trajan Inscription: An essay. Society of Printers, 1973.
