= Catholic Art Quarterly =

- Cover of the Catholic Art Quarterly, Pentecost edition, 1956
- Categories: Catholic social art magazine
- Frequency: Quarterly
- First issue: Winter 1937
- Final issue: 1970
- Company: Catholic Art Association
- Country: USA
- Based in: Newport, Rhode Island
- Language: English
- OCLC: 5756161

The Catholic Art Quarterly (originally the Christian Social Art Quarterly and later Good Work) was the official bulletin of the Catholic Art Association (CAA). Beginning in 1937 under the guidance of founding editor Sister Esther Newport, the magazine was published quarterly for thirty-two years.

== Description ==
The publication centered on the "social character of the arts" for both artists and art educators was seen as a contemporary of magazines like The Catholic Worker and Orate Fratres.

Writers and artists featured in the magazine included C.S. Lewis, Ade Bethune, Thomas Merton, Edward Catich, Sister Esther Newport and Graham Carey.

== History ==
At the first general meeting in October 1937 of the Catholic Art Association (then called the Catholic College Art Association), association membership decided to publish a quarterly magazine. Newport was appointed editor and the issue was to be published from the campus of the Sisters of Providence of Saint Mary-of-the-Woods, Indiana.

The CAA received church approval from Cardinal Joseph Ritter, archbishop of Indianapolis, and the first issue of the Christian Social Art Quarterly was released in December 1939.

== Gallery ==
Christian Social Art Quarterly

Catholic Art Quarterly

Good Work
