= Thomas Derrick (artist) =

British artist (1885–1954)

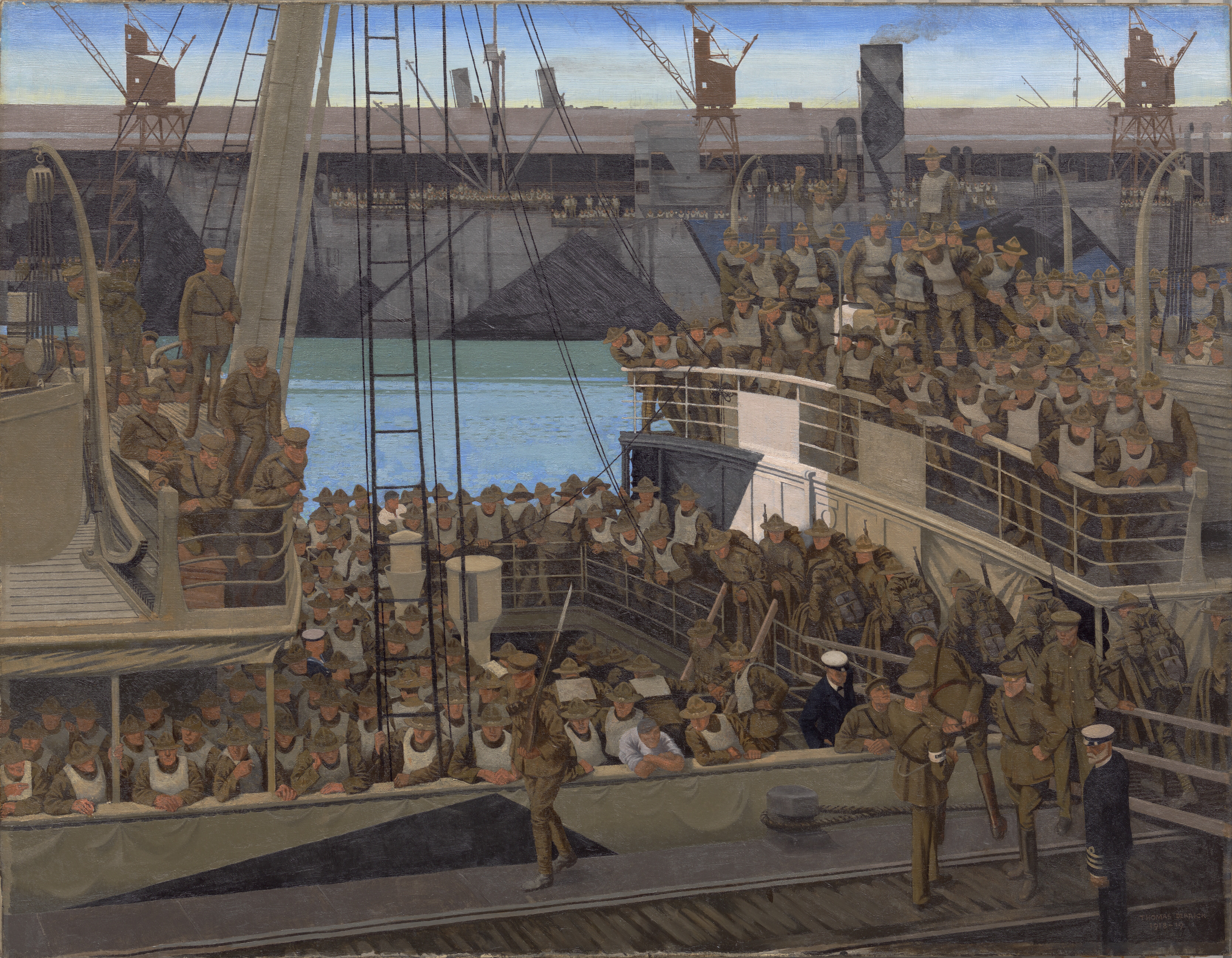
- Thomas Derrick's American Troops at Southampton Embarking for France (1918), in the collection of the Imperial War Museums
- Born: 1885; Bristol, England
- Died: 1954 (aged 68–69)
- Education: Royal College of Art
- Known for: Illustration, Stained glass

Thomas Derrick (1885–1954) was an English artist, particularly known for his work as an illustrator and cartoonist. He also designed murals and stained glass.

== Life ==
Derrick was born in Bristol in 1885 and was educated at Sidcot School. He trained as an artist at the Royal College of Art, later spending five years there as an instructor on the decorative arts. He married Margaret Clausen, the daughter of artists George Clausen and Agnes Mary Webster.

His oil painting of the Judgement of Paris, painted in 1914 as a design for a mural, was given to the Brooklyn Museum of Art by Adolph Lewisohn in 1923, and exhibited there in 1925.

In 1924 Derrick co-designed three posters for the Underground Electric Railways Company of London, and was the sole artist of a fourth in 1927. From 1931 he was active as a cartoonist, contributing to Punch, among other publications.

He moved in broadly "traditionalist" artistic and intellectual circles, numbering among his friends Hilaire Belloc, G. K. Chesterton, Ananda Coomaraswamy, Ernest William Tristram, and Vincent McNabb, the last-named being the priest who received him into the Roman Catholic Church. His work also appeared in G. K.'s Weekly.

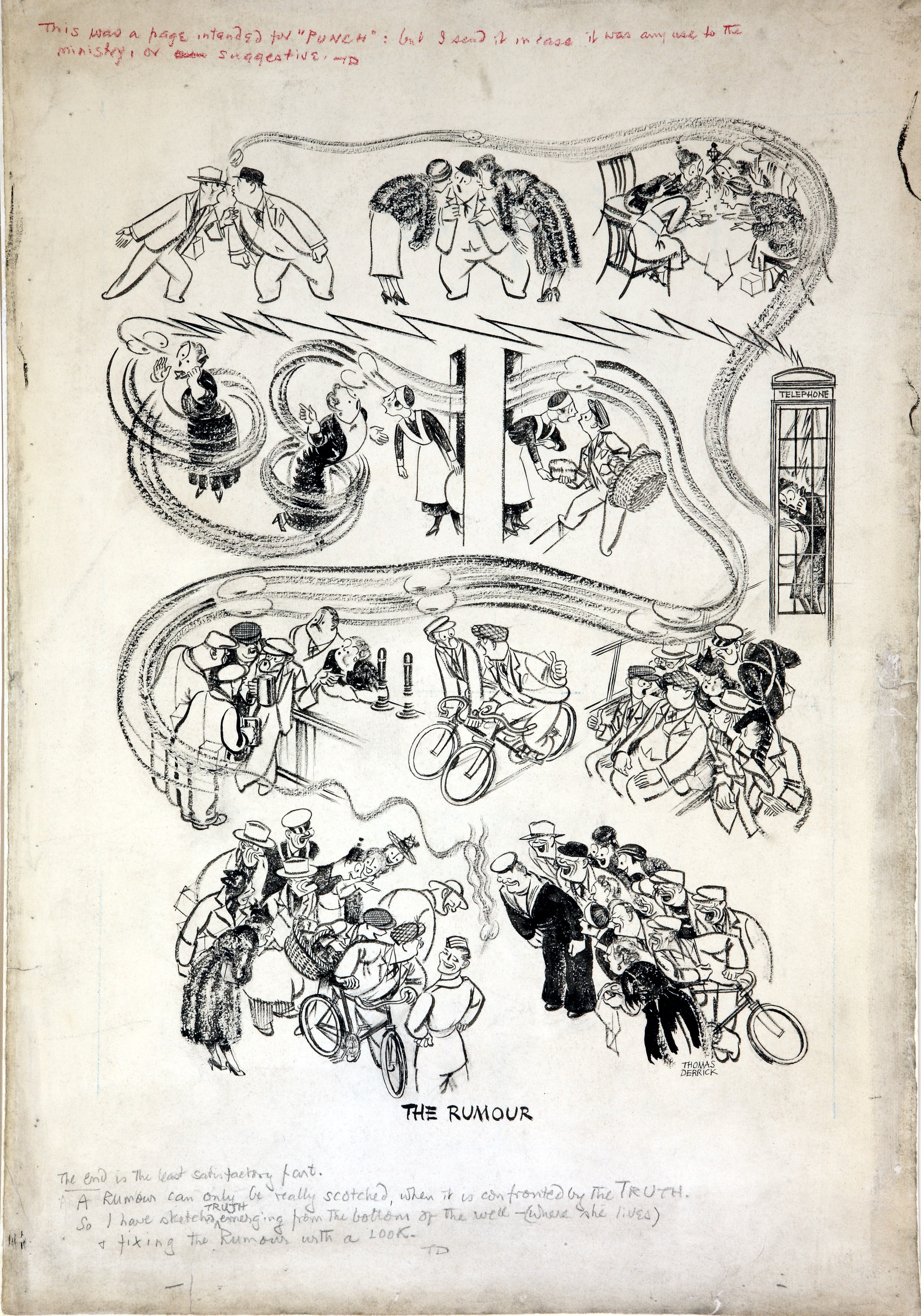
The Rumour: design for a "careless talk" public information poster

Derrick lived for some years at Cold Ash, Berkshire, and his sons, Michael and Christopher, attended the nearby Douai School. Derrick, who was a friend of the headmaster, Dom Ignatius Rice, designed the bookplates for the monastery library and for the school's Bede Library (opened 1937), contributed sketches to the Douai Magazine, and painted portraits of some of the abbots and headmasters.

He died in 1954.

== Works ==
=== Painting ===
- The Judgement of Paris. Oil painting. 1914. Brooklyn Museum of Art.
- American Troops at Southampton Embarking for France. Oil painting. 1918. Imperial War Museums

=== Book illustration ===
- Kathleen Fitzgerald, Les Fables de La Fontaine choisies et recueillies pour les enfants; Illustrées par T. C. Derrick. London: Siegle, Hill et Cie., [1910].
- Henriette Stowe, La Case de l'Oncle Tom; tr. Kathleen Fitzgerald, ill. Thomas Derrick. Philadelphia: George W. Jacobs, [1911].
- Miguel de Cervantes, Don Quichotte de la Manche; Abrégé pour les enfants par Kathleen Fitz Gerald, ill. Thomas Derrick. Londres: Siegle Hill, c.1912.
- Arthur Tooth (Warden of Woodside Orphanage, Croydon), Here begynneth ye storie of ye palmerman. (Done into manuscript and adorned with pictures by Thomas Derrick). London: T. Fisher Unwin, 1914.
- Charles White, A Little Book of Ancient Landmarks within and around London. London: Underground Electric Railways Company, c.1917.
- Hugh B. C. Pollard, The Story of Ypres. London: McBride, Nast & Co, 1917.
- Giovanni Boccaccio, The Decameron. London: Chatto & Windus, 1920. 11 full-page illustrations.
- C. Armstrong Gibbs, The Betrothal: a fairy play (sequel to "The Blue Bird") by M. Maerterlinck (piano score). London: B. Feldman & Co, c1921. Title page.
- Eleanor Farjeon, The ABC of the B.B.C. London: W. Collins Sons, c1928.
- Richard Hakluyt, The Principal Navigations, Voyages, Traffiques & Discoveries of the English Nation. 10 vols. London & Toronto: J. M. Dent & Sons, 1927-1928.
- G.K. Chesterton, The Turkey and the Turk; arranged and pictured by Thomas Derrick. [Ditchling: St. Dominic's Press, 1930].
- Ambrose Bierce, Battle Sketches. Oxford: printed at the Shakespeare Head Press ... for the First Edition Club, 1930.
- Ernest Rhys (ed.), Everyman; arranged and pictured by Thomas Derrick. Everyman's library 381. London and Toronto: Dent, and New York: Dutton, 1930.
- Hilaire Belloc, Nine Nines, or, Novenas from a Chinese Litany of Odd Numbers; pictures by Thomas Derrick. Oxford: Basil Blackwell, 1931.
- Cyril Alington, Cautionary Catches, adorned by Thomas Derrick. Oxford: Basil Blackwell, 1931.
- The Prodigal Son and other Parables, shown in pictures by Thomas Derrick. Oxford: Basil Blackwell, 1931.
- Richard Dark, Shakespeare - and that crush: being Angela's guide to English literature; with illustrations by Thomas Derrick. Oxford: Basil Blackwell, 1931.
- Frederick Samuel Thacker, Kennet Country; pictures by Thomas Derrick. Oxford: Basil Blackwell, 1932.
- Richard Dark, The Hilarious Universe. Being Angela’s guide to Einstein - and that crush; pictures by Thomas Derrick. Oxford: Basil Blackwell, 1932.
- The Muses. Traduced in Pictures by T. Derrick. London: Basil Blackwell, 1933.
- Richard Dark, Jobs for Jane. Another outrage by Richard Dark. Thomas Derrick again accessory. Oxford: Basil Blackwell, 1934.
- G. K. Chesterton (ed.), GK's: A Miscellany of the First 500 Issues of G.K.'s Weekly. London: Rich & Cowan, 1934. Frontispiece.
- Stephen L. Robertson, The Shropshire Racket [parodies of A. E. Housman]; with pictures by Thomas Derrick. London: Sheed & Ward, 1937.
- C. E. M. Joad, The Untutored Townsman's Invasion of the Country; with drawings by Thomas Derrick. London: Faber & Faber, 1946.
- Evelyn Waugh, Mr Loveday's Little Outing. London: Chapman & Hall, 1936. First edition jacket design & title illustration.

=== London Underground posters ===
- with Edward Bawden, British Empire Exhibition. Published by Underground Electric Railways Company Ltd, 1924. Printed by Eyre & Spottiswoode. LTM ref. no. 1983/4/1767.
- with Katherine Ritchie, To the Thames Valley by Motor Bus. Published by Underground Electric Railways Company Ltd, 1924. Printed by Eyre & Spottiswoode. LTM ref. no. 1983/4/1727.
- with Katherine Ritchie, The Way to London's Country by Motor Bus. Published by Underground Electric Railway Company Ltd, 1924. Printed by Eyre & Spottiswoode. LTM ref. no. 1983/4/1724.
- In the Spring, a Young Man's Fancy. Published by Underground Electric Railways Company Ltd, 1927. Printed by Vincent Brooks, Day & Son Ltd. LTM ref. no. 1983/4/2145.

== See also ==
- Hilaire Belloc and G. K. Chesterton

== Sources ==
- H. R. Westwood, Modern Caricaturists (1932), pp. 111–114.
- Mark Bryant, Dictionary of Twentieth-Century British Cartoonists and Caricaturists (2000), pp. 57–59.
