= Ade Bethune =

American liturgical artist (1914–2002)

- Born: January 12, 1914; Schaerbeek, Belgium
- Died: May 1, 2002 (aged 88); Portsmouth, Rhode Island, U.S.
- Education: Cooper Union
- Known for: Woodcuts; illustration
- Movement: Catholic social art

Adélaide de Bethune (January 12, 1914 – May 1, 2002) was a Belgian-American liturgical artist. She was associated with the Catholic Worker Movement, and designed an early masthead of its publication, the Catholic Worker, first used in 1935. She later re-designed this in 1985, replacing one of the men with a woman.

Bethune was an advocate of traditional iconography in the Catholic Church. She was inducted into the Rhode Island Heritage Hall of Fame in 1990.

== Life ==
Born Baroness Adélaide de Bethune to a noble Belgian family, her parents were Gaston and Marthe Terlinden. She emigrated with the family after World War I. Her mother Marthe was daughter of Viscount Terlinden.

=== Career ===
Bethune volunteered her illustrations to improve the quality of the Catholic Worker when she was a nineteen-year-old art student, impressed with the work of Dorothy Day. This was preparation for her later illustration for Catholic liturgical works such as My Sunday Missal in 1937, and similar works such as My Lenten Missal.

De Bethune also worked closely with Graham Carey and with the Catholic Art Association, founded in 1937 by Esther Newport. Beginning in the 1960s, she was the artistic director of the Terra Sancta Guild, a commercial firm that produced religious art works for many Christian denominations.

==== Social activism ====
Ade was interested in the Catholic Worker Movement's work with hospitality for the poor when she was an art student. She continued this interest throughout her life, and became interested in the issue of providing housing for the elderly, particularly the poor elderly. In 1969, she founded the Church Community Housing Corporation in Newport County, Rhode Island, to design and build housing. In 1991, she founded Star of the Sea to renovate a former Carmelite convent into an intentional community and state of the art housing for the elderly, where she lived until her death in 2002. She is buried at Portsmouth Abbey, Portsmouth, Rhode Island.

== Artistic works ==
- Crucifix, St. Paulinus Parish, Clairton, Pennsylvania
- Design of St. Leo Church in St. Paul, Minnesota, including revival of a central altar
- Altar chapel and stained glass oculus at the Chapel + Cultural Center at Rensselaer
- Mosaic wall of the Baptistery, Church of the Angry Christ, Victorias City, Philippines
- Mosaic murals and lacquer tabernacle in collaboration with the Czech architect Antonin Raymond, and Filipino American artist, Alfonso Ossorio, Chapel of Saint Joseph the Worker, Negros Island, Philippines

== Biography ==
- Judith Stoughton: Proud Donkey of Schaerbeek: Ade Bethune, Catholic Worker Artist St. Cloud, Minnesota, North Star Press of St. Cloud, 1988 ISBN 0-87839-051-0
- On-line short biography
- James A. Merolla Where are they now? Ade Bethune, Catholic Worker artist
- Information from the Catholic Worker

== Sources ==
- The Ade Bethune Collection
- The Long Loneliness: The Autobiography of Dorothy Day; illustrated by Fritz Eichenberg; introduction by Daniel Berrigan. ISBN 0-06-061751-9
