= Catholic Art Association =

- Abbreviation: CAA
- Formation: 1937
- Dissolved: 1970
- Type: Member organization
- Legal status: Not for profit
- Location: United States

The Catholic Art Association (CAA) was founded in 1937 by Sister Esther Newport as an organization of artists, art educators and others interested in Catholic art and its philosophy. The CAA published the Catholic Art Quarterly, sponsored annual conventions, and hosted workshops until the organization dwindled and eventually dissolved in 1970.

== History ==
In 1936, Sister Esther Newport saw a need for improved art education in Catholic schools and for a set of standards regarding ecclesiastical art. She drew up an initial proposal for a Catholic College Art Association that year but did not find much support at that time. After a Peter Boswell column in the March 1937 issue of Art Digest addressed similar issues in Catholic art, Newport revisited her idea and sent it to Boswell. He in turn gave the proposal publicity in his April 1937 column and helped to garner public support for the organization.

Newport then called for an organizational meeting at Providence High School in Chicago. There she and other interested parties founded the Catholic College Art Association and planned for its first general meeting that October on the campus of the Sisters of Providence of Saint Mary-of-the-Woods in Indiana.

=== Philosophical foundation ===
Newport enlisted art critic and philosopher Graham Carey to provide an underlying foundation for the CAA. Carey was already known for his "Catholic Philosophy of Art" and agreed to be an advisor to the organization and to speak at its first general meeting. Carey would go on to be a prominent voice in the CAA, advocating for the integration of social thinking with art and religion.

The Association was unique in its inclusion of women in the fields of art and architecture. Besides the presence of Newport and many Catholic sisters, the CAA employed three women as its executive secretaries. It also worked closely with lay liturgical artist Ade Bethune, co-founder of the Catholic Worker Movement, and Hildreth Meiere, who helped to found the Liturgical Arts Society.
