= Altars for Peace =

Set of wooden tables by George Nakashima

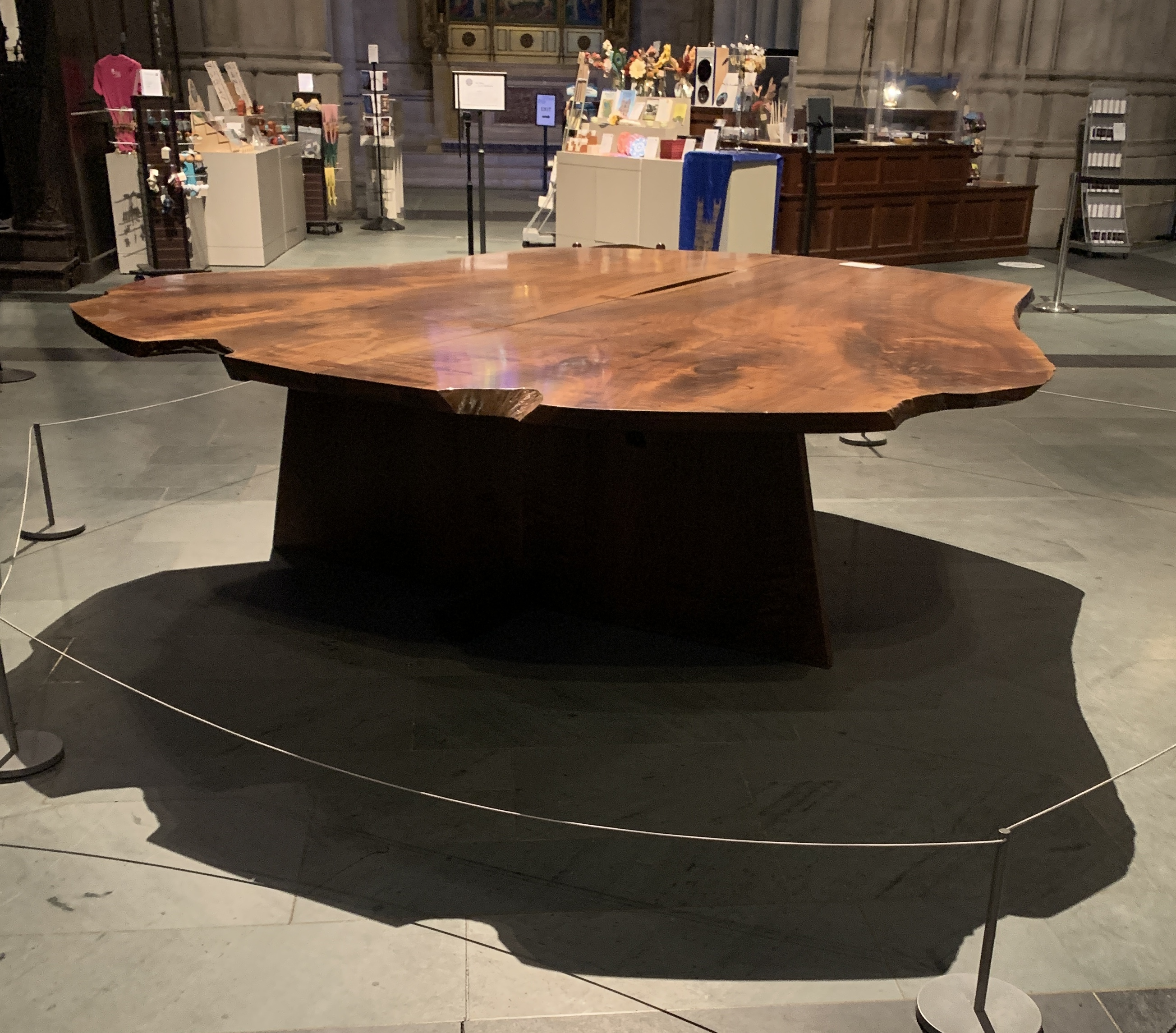
An Altar for Peace in the Cathedral of St. John the Divine (2021)

The Altars for Peace are a series of wooden tables conceived by George Nakashima. Several altars have been placed around the world, beginning with one in the Cathedral of St. John the Divine in 1986. Others are located in Russia, India, and South Africa.

== Background and conceptualization ==
George Nakashima (1905–1990) was a pioneering American woodworker and designer described as "America's most important contemporary woodworker" in a 2020 Architectural Digest article. In the 1980s he was deemed "the dean of the world's woodworkers." He studied architecture in college and later learned Japanese carpentry styles in the 1930s before being interned in the 1940s, where he continued to study carpentry. Nakashima started selling furniture in 1945, a company that grew to have wide appeal. Nakashima reportedly believed trees had souls and sought to find their "living spirit," according to a profile in The New York Times.

Nakashima came up with the concept of creating "Altars for Peace" around 1983 upon discovering a walnut tree that was about three hundred years old from a logger. To him, the tree was a "once in a lifetime tree". It had taken a week to cut down and The New York Times reported just one type of saw could cut it. Nakashima reported that he wanted the peace movement to have "something tangible, a sort of symbol, something you can put your hands on,'' and felt that the tree deserved "special meaning and special use." The idea reportedly came from a dream in 1983 after Nakashima underwent surgery that had threatened his life. Right after having the dream, he began planning.

The first Altar for Peace was slowly shaped from the walnut tree. Nakashima had it brought to North Carolina, where a mill concluded nothing held on the eastern coast of the US could adequately cut the tree. He then brought the tree to Philadelphia and had Scott Wineland, a friend from California with expertise in cutting trees, fly a chainsaw mill in. The two and others began cutting the tree on January 16, 1984, at the Thompson Mahogany Company. It took a week to cut the trunk and the process was almost derailed when a concrete pipe that an arborist had put in the tree was hit. The wood then had to be dried for two years.

In 1985 Nakashima was informed about a 12-ton dying Northern California black walnut tree discovered near Sandy Gulch, California. He flew out to aid in cutting the tree up. He envisioned building a table where people would sit at and discuss peace. He told The Chico Enterprise-Record in 1985 that "If the wood in their [diplomat's] tables is false, their discussions begin falsely as well." Nakashima and his supporters in the effort were divided over how many altars to build—some proposed two, one that would go in the United Nations Secretariat Building in New York and another to Hiroshima, while others suggested five spread across continents. Nakashima also proposed an altar in Santa Fe, New Mexico.

== Construction, dedication, and later efforts ==
Nakashima constructed his altar at the George Nakashima House, Studio and Workshop in Bucks County, Pennsylvania. He combined two slabs of wood. When completed it weighed 3/4 of a ton, in approximately a triangle about 3 inches (76 mm) thick and 14 feet (4.3 m) by 12 feet (3.7 m). Nakashima estimated that it had cost him $10,000. He initially sought to put it in the UN, envisioning a place where it could "belong to everyone" and be "dedicated to the divine and peace". This effort was unsuccessful, and Nakashima turned to his friend Steven Clark Rockefeller, who put him in touch with James Parks Morton of the Cathedral of St. John the Divine. The two worked to select a location in the cathedral and it was scheduled to be dedicated during a Concert for Peace on New Year's Eve 1986. An estimated 5,000 people were present at the dedication. Nakashima sought to build more altars in the future and funds to aid in the effort were raised by a group led by Steven Clark Rockefeller. The Altar for Peace Foundation was created to further efforts.

After Nakashima's death in 1990, his daughter Mira Nakashima continued efforts to place altars around the world. The next one was completed and delivered to Russia, where it was called a Peace Table and approved for placement in the Russian Academy of Sciences in February 1992. The altar was supposed to be dedicated on September 2, 1992. However, in 2013 it was on display in the Russian Academy of Arts. By that year altars had been placed in Russia, New York, India (in Auroville, dedicated 1996), and a fourth was set to be placed in the Desmond Tutu Peace Centre in Cape Town, South Africa.
