= Mira Nakashima =

American furniture maker and architect

Mira Nakashima-Yarnell
- Born: 1942 (age 83–84); Seattle, Washington, U.S.
- Education: Harvard University (AB 1963); Waseda University
- Known for: Furniture maker and architect
- Website: https://nakashimawoodworkers.com/

Mira Nakashima-Yarnall (born 1942) is an architect and furniture maker. She is the daughter of George Nakashima and is now the president and creative director of George Nakashima, Woodworker.

== Early life and education ==
Nakashima was born in 1942 in Seattle, Washington. When Mira was six weeks old, during World War II, she was sent with her parents to the Minidoka War Relocation Center in Idaho. During their internment, her father George learned woodworking under master carpenter Gentaro Hikogawa. In 1943 the family was sponsored by architect Antonin Raymond for release from the camp, and they relocated to New Hope, Pennsylvania. An image from 1945 shows the Nakashima family gathered for dinner in their Pennsylvania home.

Nakashima was interested in studying music or languages, but her father urged her to follow in his footsteps and study architecture. She attended Harvard University and received a Bachelor of Arts degree in 1963. She went on to receive a master's degree in architecture from Waseda University in Tokyo.

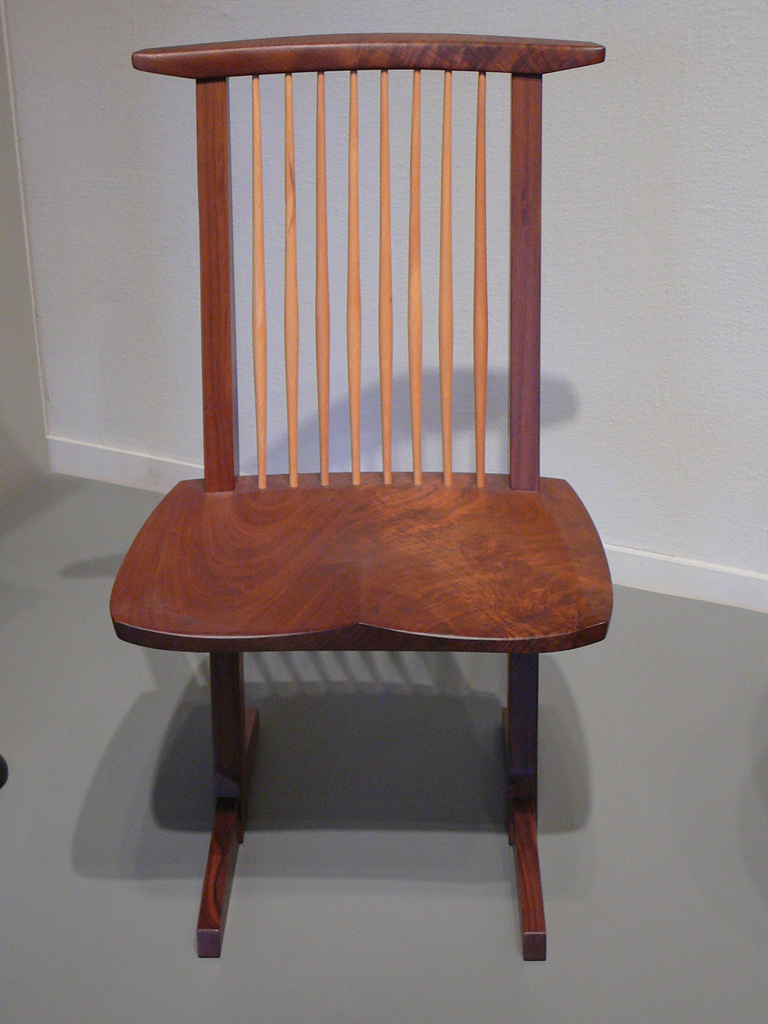
Conoid Chair by George Nakashima, 1988. Mira Nakashima still produces the Conoid Chair and it is currently their most popular piece.

== Woodworking career ==
Nakashima began her woodworking career in 1970 when her father offered her a job in his furniture making workshop and built her a home across the road. Of working with her father, Nakashima states "I was pretty much the understudy... I can't count the number of times I was fired while Dad was alive. It was very good discipline." Over time, Nakashima learned to build all of her father's designs. When George died in 1990 she took over the furniture making business, continuing to produce his designs as well as her own.

Nakashima picked up right where her father left off, continuing his tradition as well as exploring some new possibilities. In addition to the foundational philosophies of George Nakashima to create forms that are reminiscent to the trees, Mira Nakashima instilled the importance of collaboration among the woodworkers and artisans work. In 2003, Nakashima published a book titled Nature, Form & Spirit: The Life and Legacy of George Nakashima which coincided with a documentary film and an exhibit of George Nakashima work at the Mingei International Museum in San Diego. In 2001, Nakashima held an exhibition at Moderne Gallery in Philadelphia showcasing her father's original work alongside new works created under her supervision. "The Keisho Collection: Continuity and Change in the Nakashima Tradition" was the first catalogue of works designed and produced by Mira Nakashima and was meant to show the new direction in the Nakashima Studio. Work from the Keisho collection have been exhibited at Mingei International Museum in San Diego, the Sun Valley Center for the Arts in Idaho, and the Japanese American National Museum in Los Angeles. In 2003, she designed and produced chairs for the Concordia Chamber Players, which are now sold as the Concordia Chair in the Nakashima line. She displayed work at the Moderne Gallery again in September 2013, in an exhibition titled "Nakashima Woodworkers: An Evolving Legacy." In 2019 she curated a show at the Michener Art Museum titled "Nakashima Looks: Studio Furniture at the Michener." The exhibition featured her own work alongside work by Wharton Esherick, Isamu Noguchi, Harry Bertoia, Phillip Lloyd Powell, Paul Evans, and Noémi Raymond. A piece that was displayed at the exhibition titled "Tsuitate Sofa," exemplifies Nakashima's intricate approach to woodworking, while still keeping true to her father's sense of design. In 2020, she collaborated with architect John Heah to produce furniture for the Connaught Grill in London.

In 2007, Mira Nakashima was featured in a LANDSCAPE episode of Craft in America on PBS. In 2010, she was interviewed by oral historian James McElhinney, for the Archives of American Art's Nanette L. Laitman Documentation Project for Craft and Decorative Arts in America. Nakashima and her studio were featured in Nick Offerman's 2016 book Good Clean Fun. On March 11, 2023, Nakashima gave a public lecture at the Gardner Center for Asian Art and Ideas at the Seattle Asian Art Museum as part of their 2022–2023 Saturday University Lecture Series. When asked what kind of legacy she would like to leave behind to the next generation of woodworkers, Nakashima offered a summation of her artistic philosophy: "Harvest materials sustainably and replant as many trees as possible. Know and respect the woods local to your area and use them whenever possible... Do not imitate forms, but create your own. Remember that less is more; don’t complicate things just to be different."

The highest known auction record for Mira Nakashima's work was set in 2018 at the Freeman's design auction when a Claro walnut dining table and set of eight Conoid chairs in the studio's signature style sold for $150,000.

== Personal life ==
Her daughter, Maria, is an architect living in Winnipeg.
