= Moderne Gallery =

Art and design studio in the United States

- Industry: Furniture
- Founded: 1984
- Headquarters: Philadelphia, Pennsylvania, United States
- Products: Modern furniture
- Website: modernegallery.com

Moderne Gallery is an American art and design gallery in Philadelphia, Pennsylvania that focuses on art and furniture from the American studio craft movement of the 20th century. Moderne Gallery maintains a large collection of ceramics, woodwork, woodturning, glass, and metalwork.

== History ==
The gallery was founded in 1984 by Robert Aibel. Initially, Moderne was focused on French Art Deco work, but In 1985, the gallery pivoted to focusing on artwork and furniture from the Studio craft movement after selling a dining table and chair set created by George Nakashima. Shortly thereafter Moderne became the first gallery to start promoting Nakashima's work. Moderne Gallery is considered an instrumental organization in making George Nakashima a more recognizable artist of 20th century modern design.

Along with other art studios and local collectors, Moderne Gallery launched a pop-up exhibition and design showroom. The exhibit was held in 2016 around the New Kensington arts district.

In 2022, Moderne Gallery was listed as one of the best furniture stores in Philadelphia by The Philadelphia Inquirer.

== Location ==
Moderne Gallery had its studio in Old City, Philadelphia from 1984 to 2018. In 2019, Moderne Gallery moved to a 4,500 square foot gallery in Port Richmond, Philadelphia.

== Artists ==
Moderne Gallery is considered a leading Nakashima dealer and has organized several exhibits for the artist. Moderne also showcases art and woodwork by Nakashima's daughter, Mira Nakashima.

Other artists Moderne Gallery promotes:

- Eric Allen
- John Eric Byers
- John Cage
- Miriam Carpenter
- Arthur Espenet Carpenter
- Wendell Castle
- John Cederquist
- John Conver Lutz
- Zein Daouk
- Fabien Dubrunfaut
- Karima Duchamp
- David Ebner
- Wharton Esherick
- David Gilhooly
- Estelle Halper
- Dan Jackson
- Riyoo Kim
- Sam Maloof
- Emil Milan
- Jere Osgood
- Caprice Pierucci
- James Prestini
- Don Reitz
- Bob Stocksdale
- Toshiko Takaezu
- Tanaka Tomomi
- Ryo Toyonaga
