= Huyler Building =

Historic commercial building in New York, United States

- The Huyler Building
- U.S. National Register of Historic Places
- New York State Register of Historic Places
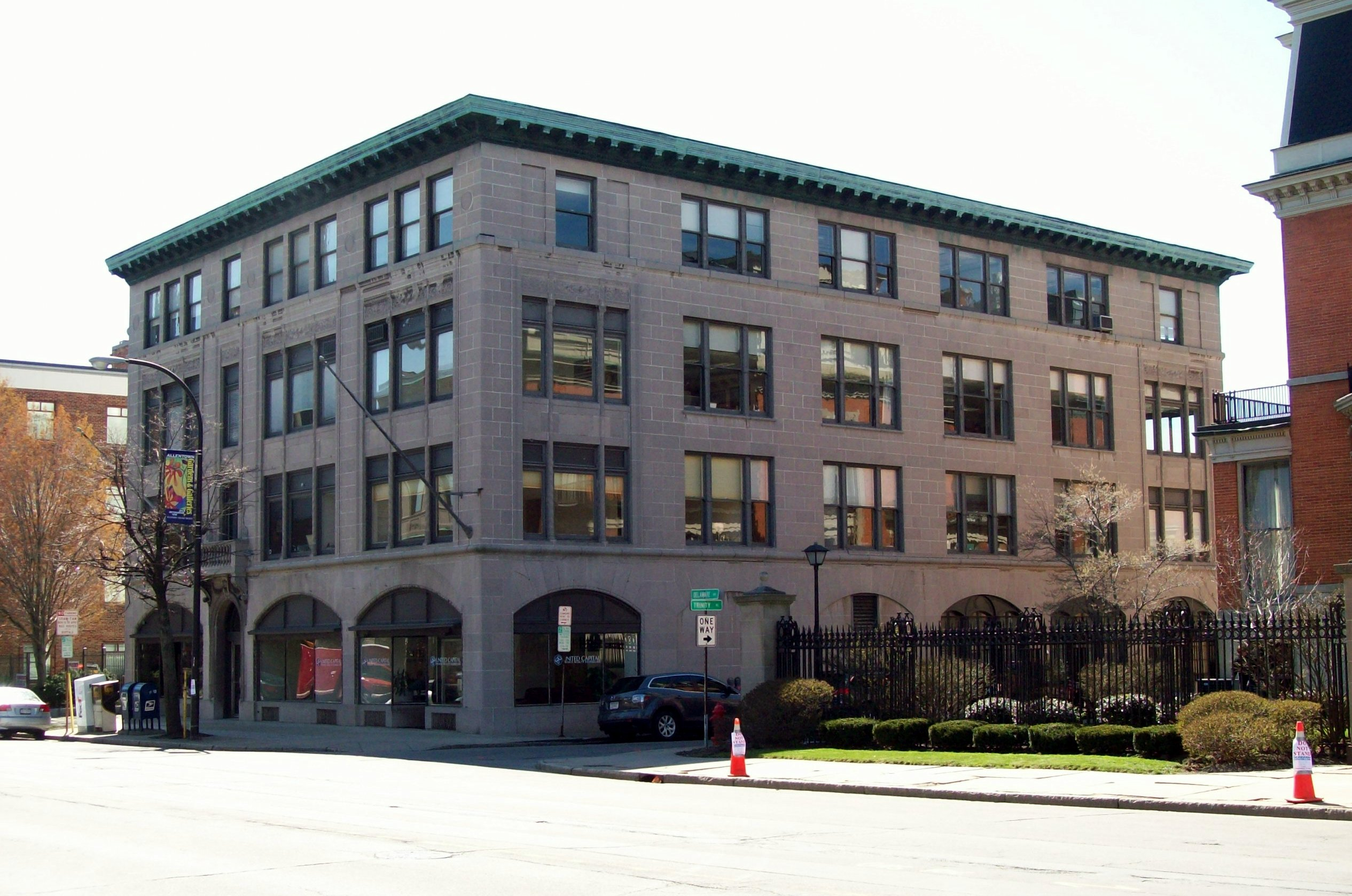
- The Huyler Building, April 2012

- Location within New York Location within the United States
- Location: 374 Delaware Ave., Buffalo, New York
- Coordinates: 42°53′41″N 78°52′32″W
- Area: 0.42 acres (0.17 ha)
- Built: 1926
- Architects: Horton, Harvey Starin
- Architectural style: Classical Revival
- NRHP reference No.: 12000010
- NYSRHP No.: 02940.000653

Significant dates
- Added to NRHP: February 8, 2012
- Designated NYSRHP: December 19, 2011

The Huyler Building is a historic commercial and office building located in downtown Buffalo in Erie County, New York. It was built in 1926, and is a four-story, four-bay, reinforced concrete building faced in cast stone and brick in the Classical Revival-style. The front facade features three large segmental-arched display windows, balustraded balconet, and carved "Huyler's" logo with flanking griffons. Some of the interior commercial space at 376 Delaware was installed by Antonin Raymond (1888-1976) in 1939–1940. It was originally built for the Huyler's candy company and for over 80 years occupied by the locally prominent Pitt Petri store.

It was listed on the National Register of Historic Places in 2012.
