= Butterfly joint =

Type of joint used to fasten pieces of wood together

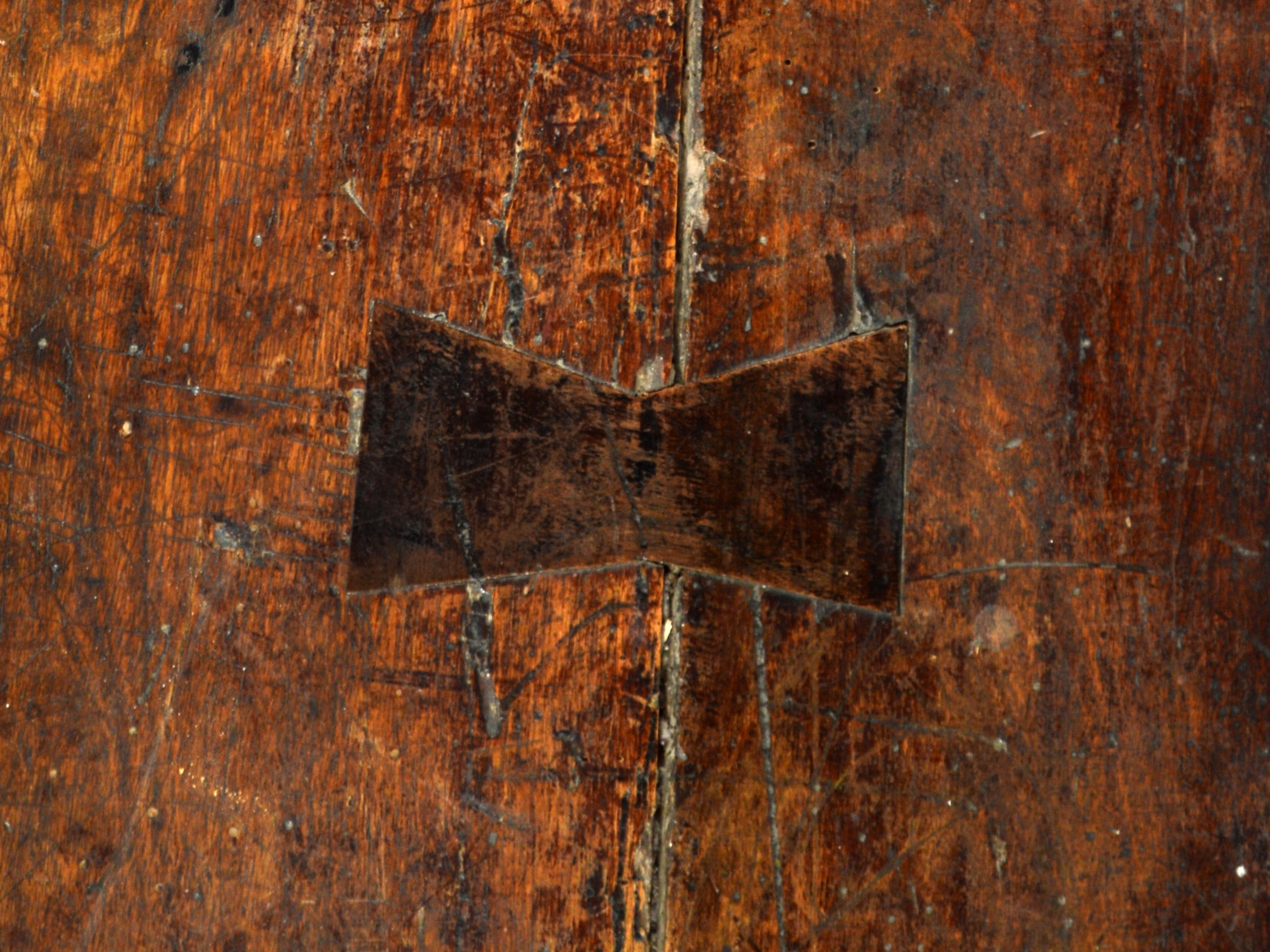
Butterfly joint

A butterfly joint, also called a bow tie, dovetail key, Dutchman joint, or Nakashima joint, is a type of joint or inlay used to hold two or more pieces of wood together. These types of joints are mainly used for aesthetics, but they can also be used to reinforce cracks in pieces of wood, doors, picture frames, or drawers.

A dovetail key resembles two dovetails connected at the narrow part. A negative of the hole is cut out of the board the butterfly will be placed in and the butterfly is then fitted, keeping the joint together. The wood used for the butterfly is usually a contrasting wood, often walnut.

== History ==
=== Dutchman Joint ===
The term Dutchman is used when a patch or inlay covers a miss-cut or an imperfect piece of wood. A Dutchman can also cover a knot in the wood. A Dutchman can be wood or metal. The name originated in San Francisco after the gold rush, when all types of European craftsmen came to California to earn a living. The term Dutchman is slang given to the woodworking process of inserting patches. The term has been found in the literature of John Russell Bartlett, in the Dictionary of Americanisms, and in Edward H. Knight's American Mechanical Dictionary.

=== Dovetail Key ===
In 1894, Jacques De Morgan discovered a group of boats at the pyramid complex of Khakaure Senwosret III at Dahshur. Butterfly, or dovetail, joints were recorded as being used. Some archaeologists argue that the dovetail joints were not originally fitted for the boats but were a modern replacement. The dovetail joints appear to have been set into the faces of the planks after the excavation, to provide strength so that they would not fall apart during transport. The craftsmanship of the joints was different from in the rest of the boats, and because they were not fixed in place, any type of force could cause the joint to fall out. There was also no mention of the joints in Morgan's original notes, written when he first saw the boats. It is unlikely that he would have missed them if they were present. There have been reports of traditional Japanese boats using butterfly cramps but these were held in place by shellac.

== Modern use ==
Contemporary decorative dovetail keys are commonly seen in and associated with the work of George Nakashima. George Nakashima, a Japanese-American woodworker, made the butterfly joint famous in the 1950s. He incorporated it into his nature-inspired woodworking pieces. Nakashima's idea was not to change the wood, but only to enhance its beauty.
