= Carl Graffunder =

American architect

- Born: March 23, 1919; Rock Island, Illinois, U.S.
- Died: August 27, 2013 (aged 94)
- Education: University of Minnesota (BArch); Harvard University (MArch)
- Occupation: Architect

Carl Graffunder (March 23, 1919 – August 27, 2013) was a mid-century modernist architect whose influence from European modernism, Frank Lloyd Wright and Antonin Raymond manifested in many residential and commercial structures mostly in Minnesota. He was born in Rock Island, Illinois and raised in Hibbing, Minnesota. He received his Bachelor of Architecture at the University of Minnesota in 1942 and Master of Architecture from Harvard University in 1948. Graffunder was the chief draftsman for Antonin Raymond in New York City from 1946 to 1947. Graffunder taught for the University of Minnesota School of Architecture from 1948 until his retirement in the 1980s.

Leighton home in Minneapolis, MN

His commercial building projects include:

- Normandale Lutheran Church, Minneapolis, MN
- Bethany Lutheran Church, Minneapolis, MN
- Stevens Square Nursing Home, Minneapolis, MN
