= Huyler's =

American candy and restaurant chain

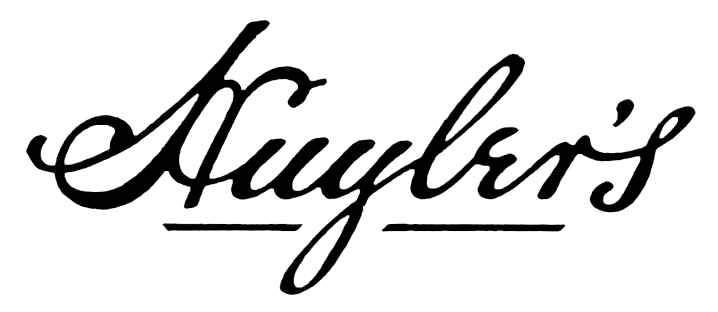
- Industry: Food
- Founded: 1874; 151 years ago in New York City, New York, United States
- Founder: John S. Huyler
- Defunct: 1964
- Key people: Milton Hershey (employee from 1883 to 1885)
- Products: Candy, chocolate

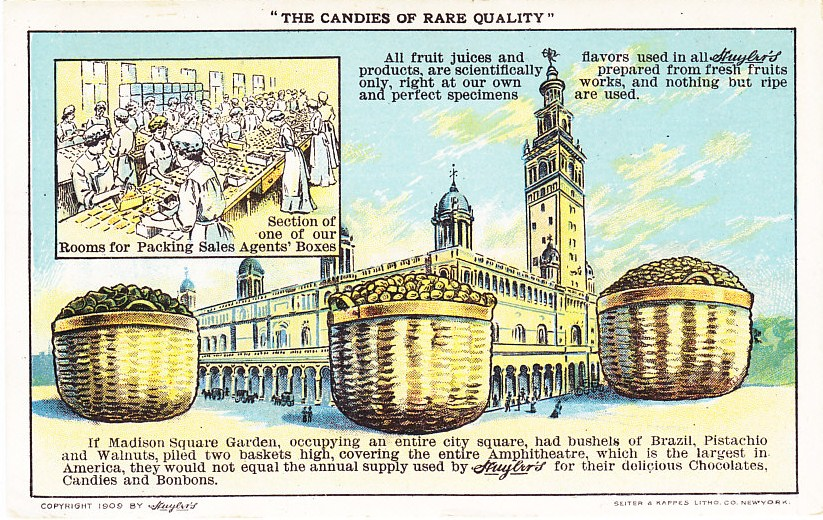
"[N]othing but ripe and perfect specimens are used" a company advertisement promised in 1909.

Huyler's was a candy and restaurant chain in the New York City metropolitan area that operated from 1874 to 1964, and for a time was the largest and most prominent chocolate maker in the United States. It was founded by John S. Huyler (rhymes with "Tyler"), who had grown up working in his father's bakery and ice cream store.

In 1883, the chain's candy factory was located at Irving Place and 18th Street in Manhattan. (The New York City Telephone Building occupied the opposite corner of 18th Street.) In a 1901 issue of The New York Times, the firm was on a list of businesses that had been in existence for at least 50 years. This is not consistent with the year when the company was founded, but may have included the shop run by Huyler's father. Huyler eventually became a trustee of Syracuse University. He died in 1910 at age 65.

== Company history ==
John Seys Huyler was born in New York City on June 26, 1846, to David and Abigail Ann (née DeKlyn) Huyler. His father had a bakery and ice cream shop in Greenwich Village, probably on Jane Street. The family lived above the store. Huyler began working in his father's shop as a teenager. He began making a soft molasses candy and selling out of his father’s store.

John Huyler's first business was a shop on Broadway near 18th Street. It sold ice cream and candy. Huyler marketed his candy by placing a candy puller in the front store window, so that people walking by would stop and watch the candy being made. He saved the profit from the endeavor and put it back in his business, opening his first store in 1874. A few years later he opened three more stores in Manhattan, Brooklyn, and Albany. In 1881 the company was incorporated and became known as Huyler’s, Inc. A factory was constructed at Eleventh and Bleecker Streets in New York City, to manufacture candy for sale in the various shops. This facility was quickly out-grown, and replaced around 1883 by a larger six-story factory and office located at 62-64 Irving Place and 18th Street. Huyler’s candies were manufactured in small batches, which cost more to produce, but allowed the company to monitor the quality of the products more carefully. While the main store was located at 863 Broadway, with a reputation for freshness and purity, by 1885 Huyler’s candies were sold in fashionable Newport, Rhode Island, and the resort communities of Saratoga, New York and Long Branch, New Jersey.

Milton S. Hershey arrived in New York in the spring of 1883 and worked employed at Huyler’s until 1885 when he returned to Lancaster, Pennsylvania to establish his own company.

Huyler made frequent trips to Europe to study new candy creations being developed in England, France, and Germany.

The six-story building at Irving Place sustained $70,000 worth of damage caused by a fire on June 18, 1889. The conflagration burned three floors of the structure completely. Another fire broke out at Huyler's on the night of January 27, 1917, in a brick building separated from the main part of the candy factory. Firemen struggled for more than an hour to control the blaze which gutted a portion of the plant. One source believed the fire began because of defective insulation wires.

A Southern United States syndicate purchased Huyler's in December 1925.

In 1927, Huyler's candy and ice cream shops were owned by David A. Schulte, head of Schulte Stores. He envisioned opening five hundred stores within five years, to be operated by Huyler's Luncheonettes Inc. The new subsidiary maintained its offices at 110 East 13th Street.

The Irving Place site of Huyler's candy factory was acquired by a building syndicate in 1928. It planned to erect an apartment building in its place.

By 1955, the intellectual property of Huyler's was acquired by the Howard Johnson Company and eventually dissolved.

== Legacy ==
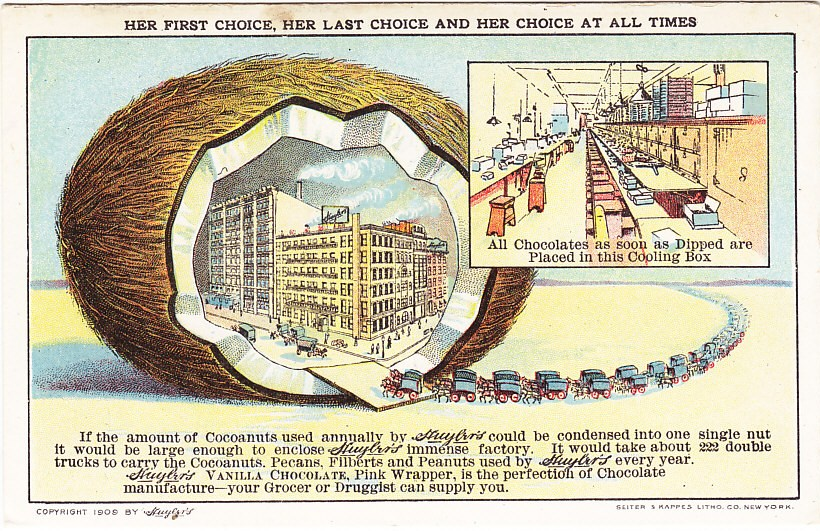
Huyler's factory in a Coconut, from a 1909 advertisement

At the time of his death on October 1, 1910, Huyler had 54 stores across America, supplied by 14 candy factories employing about 2,000 people.

Benjamin F. DeKlyn, an associate of John Huyler in the formation of the candy company, sold thirty shares of stock in Huyler's Inc., to Frank DeKlyn Huyler and Coulter D. Huyler, sons of the founder, in 1910, for $349,000. The other sons were John S. Huyler Jr., the youngest, and David Huyler. The former died after his father before reaching the age of 21. In an accounting filed in a New York Surrogate Court on October 21, 1926, the trust fund left by John S. Huyler for his three sons was found to have increased 100% over the previous thirteen years. Over the same period Huyler's widow, Mrs. Rosa F. Huyler Cooke, received $390,000 from a $500,000 trust fund.

The Huyler Building, built in Buffalo in 1926, was listed on the National Register of Historic Places in 2012.
