= Golconde Dormitory =

Coordinates: 11.9381330761°N 79.834042576°E

Golconde Dormitory, or Golconde, is a private residence and guest house for the Sri Aurobindo Ashram in the town of Puducherry, India. It was designed by architect Antonin Raymond and George Nakashima, completed in 1942. Raymond designed the building to mitigate the effects of the hot and humid climate using reinforced cast-in-place concrete, the first building in India to use this technique, recognized as "The first modernist building in India".

It was named Golconde, as token of gratitude for Sir Akbar Hydari, Prime Minister of Hyderabad State, home to historic Golconda Fort, who provided funding for the construction. In 1935, the Mother requested a Tokyo-based American architect, Antonin Raymond to develop the design for a guest house of a growing ashram community.

Raymond first came to Japan in 1919 to work as project architect for Frank Lloyd Wright's Imperial Hotel in Tokyo. George Nakashima worked for Raymond to conduct site visits in Japan, and was later assigned to supervise the Golconde project, along with Czech architect Francois Sammer. Nakashina overlooked the construction for three years, and left India in October 1939, subsequently Udar Pinto, an Indian aeronautical engineer, supervsied the construction, under his guidance.

== Construction history ==
In January 1938, Raymond, Noémi, and their son left Tokyo bound for America. This six-month journey took them initially to the Indian subcontinent and then on to Europe, including a trip to Prague.

In 1935, Raymond's office had accepted a commission to design a dormitory for the Sri Aurobindo Ashram in Pondicherry, part of French India in southeast India. A preliminary site visit was made by George Nakashima and the schematic design was completed in 1936. Although Raymond had envisioned that the dormitory would be completed in six months, Sri Aurobindo was concerned that the noise of construction would disturb the ashram, so he decided that the building would be constructed by its residents.

Initially, Nakashima, Francois Sammer (a Czech architect who had worked for Le Corbusier in Russia), and Chandulal (a devotee who had trained as an engineer), built a full-scale model of the dormitory in order to test the feasibility of the design, and then used it as a laboratory to further refine the construction methods. Nakashima's duties included doing very explicit detail drawings showing, for example, the design of the concrete formwork. Devotees even donated brass utensils so that they could be melted down to make door handles and hinges.

Raymond sought to mitigate the effects of the Pondicherry climate and oriented the Golconde dormitory (as it became known), so that its main facades faced north and south to make use of the prevailing breeze. A combination of moveable louvres on the exterior skin and woven teak sliding doors permitted ventilation without compromising on privacy. The building is still in use as an ashram today. It was the first modernist building in India.

== Bibliography ==
- Gupta, Pankaj Vir; Mueller, Christine (2021). Golconde: The Introduction of Modernism in India (2nd ed.). Actar D. ISBN 9781638408161.
- Sharma, Komal (n.d.). "Golconde: The First Modernist Building in India". Metropolis.
- Frampton, Kenneth (2006). Foreword. Crafting a Modern World: The Architecture and Design of Antonin and Noemi Raymond. By Helfrich, Kurt; Whitaker, William. Princeton Architectural Press. ISBN 1-56898-583-5.
- "Construction of Golconde" (PDF).
