= Czech Republic–Japan relations =

- Czech Republic: Japan

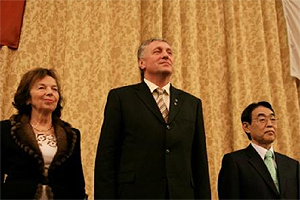
Hideaki Kumazawa, Ambassador of Japan to the Czech Republic, with Livia Klausová, First Lady of the Czech Republic, and Mirek Topolánek, Prime Minister of the Czech Republic (at the Reception to Celebrate the Emperor's Birthday on December 4, 2007)

Bilateral relations between the Czech Republic and Japan were established in 1919 by Czechoslovakia and Japan.

== History ==
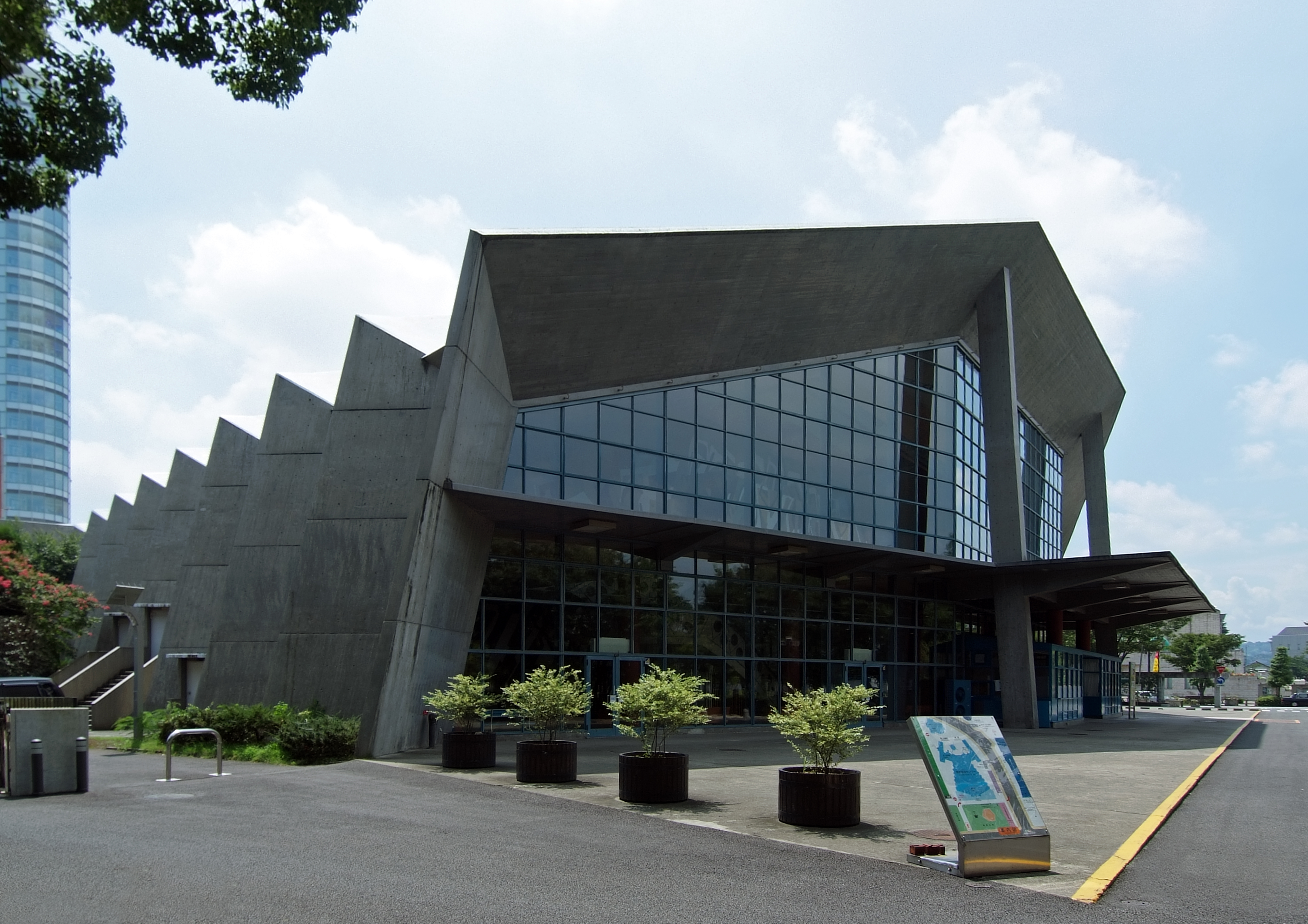
Gunma Music Center in Takasaki designed by Antonin Raymond

The diplomatic relation between Czechoslovakia and Japan was established in 1919. Czech architect Antonin Raymond was the honorary consul for the First Czechoslovak Republic in Japan from 1926 until 1939, representing the government of T. G. Masaryk. The relations were broken off during World War II from 1939, and re-established in 1957. Japan's first Minister Plenipotentiary to Czechoslovakia was Harukazu Nagaoka.

After the Dissolution of Czechoslovakia in 1993, Japan recognized the foundation of the Czech Republic and the Slovak Republic, and likewise continued diplomatic relations with both republics.

In July 2002 the Emperor and Empress of Japan, Akihito and Michiko, made an official visit to Prague.

In August 2003, Japanese Prime Minister Junichiro Koizumi paid an official visit to the Central Europe, namely Germany, Poland and the Czech Republic. On August 20, he left Warsaw for Prague as the last destination of his journey. In the afternoon of the next day, he held talks with Czech Prime Minister Vladimír Špidla at the Prime Minister's Office and there they exchanged their ideas and thoughts on the bilateral relations and significant global issues that include the nuclear ambitions of North Korea and reconstruction of Iraq, where it had been only three months since the war had ended. According to the meeting, both of the prime ministers issued the "Joint Statement towards Strategic Partnership between Japan and the Czech Republic," which celebrated 10th anniversary of their partnership and the imperial visit to Prague a year ago as an epoch-making event and proclaimed more evolution of cooperation in the bilateral relations, in assisting the renaissance of Iraq and in preventing the further proliferation of weapons of mass destruction.

== Trade and economy ==
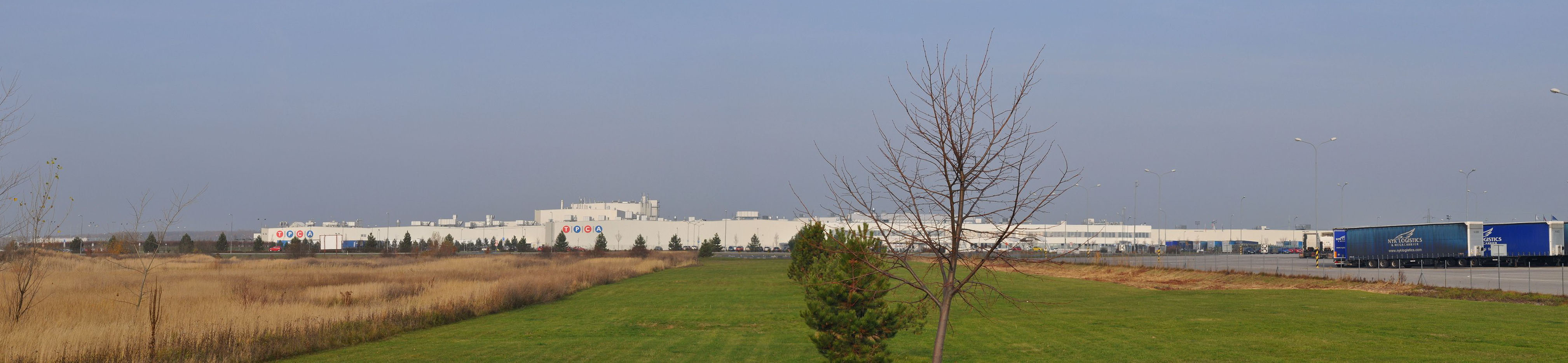
The auto factory of Toyota Motor Manufacturing Czech Republic

Economic relations between Japan and the Czech Republic have been developing steadily with rapid growth of large-scale direct investment and trade of electrical machinery and mechanical components.

In the year of 1968, when self-proclaimed "brotherhood nations" the Soviet Union and four communist states sent tanks to Prague, Japan sent a private enterprise there; that is to say, one of the largest Japanese general trading companies Mitsui & Co. started operating in the capital of the Czech Republic. A few years later the end of the Cold War, in 1993, Japan External Trade Organization, which was authorized as a government-related organization to promote Japanese export, import and investment, newly established their office in Prague. Thereafter, two of major Japanese manufacturers found their facilities, namely a television factory of Matsushita in Plzeň in 1996 and a polyester fabric factory of Toray in Prostějov in 1997.

As the most important milestone in Czech–Japanese business history, Toyota Peugeot Citroën Automobile, a private joint venture between Toyota and Peugeot Citroën, established the headquarters and auto-factory in Kolín in 2002. Its manufacturing started in February 2005, and as of March 2012, TPCA had produced more than 2 million vehicles since the initial production.

== Education relations ==
In Czech Republic, there are three universities that implemented Japanese studies courses; Charles University in Prague, Masaryk University in Brno and Palacky University in Olomouc.

== Diplomatic missions ==
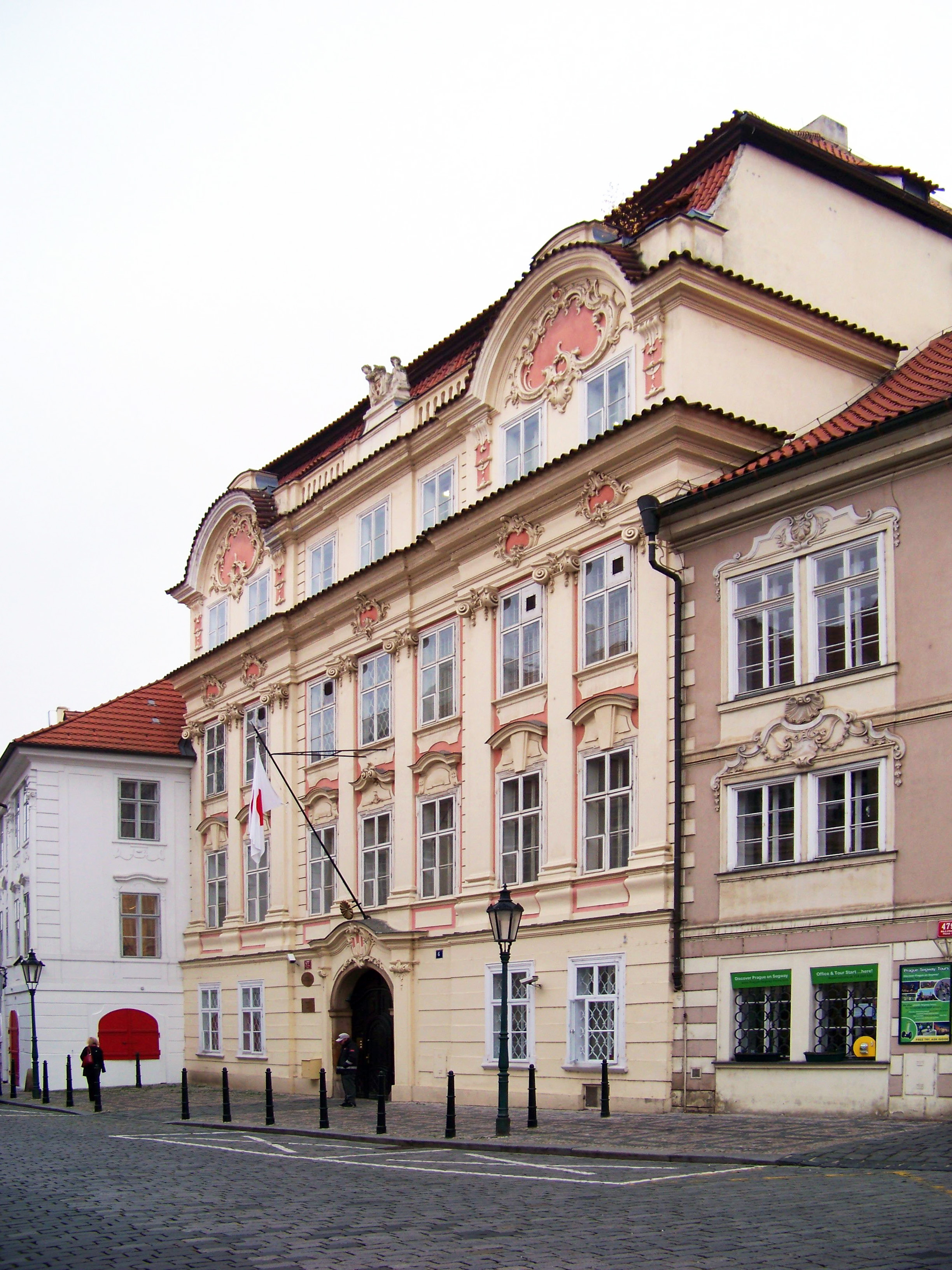
Japanese embassy in Prague

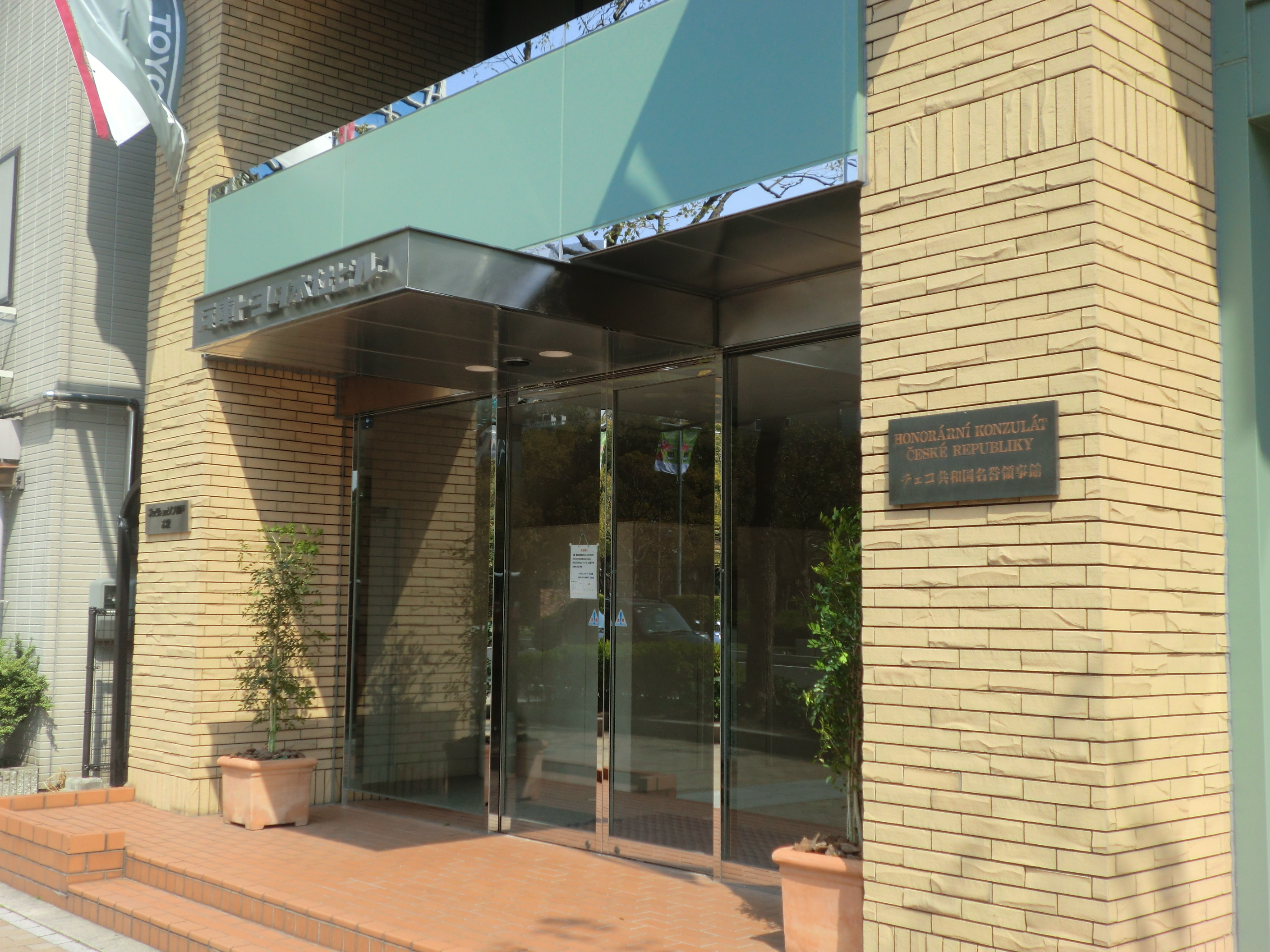
Honorary Consulate of the Czech Republic in Kobe

- Czech Republic has an embassy in Tokyo and an honorary consulate in Kobe.
- Japan has an embassy in Prague.

== Sister cities ==
- (Czech Republic) Plzeň – (Japan) Takasaki, since August 1990
- (Czech Republic) Karlovy Vary – (Japan) Kusatsu, since May 1992
- (Czech Republic) Prague – (Japan) Kyoto, since April 1996

== See also ==
- Foreign relations of the Czech Republic
- Foreign relations of Japan
