= Antonin Raymond =

Czech architect (1888–1976)

Antonín Raymond
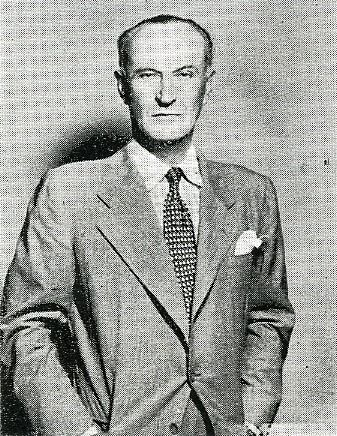
- Born: Antonín Reimann; 10 May 1888; Kladno, Kingdom of Bohemia
- Died: 25 October 1976 (aged 88); Langhorne, Pennsylvania, U.S.
- Occupation: Architect
- Awards: Medal of Honor by the New York Chapter of American Institute of Architects; The Third Order of Merit of the Rising Sun by Emperor Hirohito
- Buildings: Reinanzaka House, Golconde Dormitory, Reader’s Digest Offices, Nanzan University

Antonin Raymond (or Czech: Antonín Raymond), born as Antonín Reimann (10 May 1888 – 25 October 1976) was a Czech American architect. Raymond was born and studied in Bohemia (now part of the Czech Republic), working later in the United States and Japan. Raymond was also the Consul of Czechoslovakia to Japan from 1926 to 1939, in which year the Czech diplomacy was closed down after the occupation of the European country by Nazi Germany.

Raymond's initial work with American architects Cass Gilbert and Frank Lloyd Wright gave him an insight into the use of concrete for texture and structure that he would refine throughout his six-decade career. At studio practices in New Hope, Pennsylvania and Tokyo, he explored traditional Japanese building techniques combined with the latest In American building innovations. Raymond applied these principles to a wide range of residential, commercial, religious, and institutional projects in Japan, America, India, and the Philippines.

Along with British architect Josiah Conder, Raymond is recognized as one of the fathers of modern architecture in Japan.

== Biography ==
Raymond was born on 10 May 1888, in Kladno, Central Bohemia (now the Czech Republic) to Alois Reimann, a Jew of German descent, and his wife Růžena, a Catholic. Following the death of his mother and the bankruptcy of his father's shop the family moved to Prague in 1905. Raymond started at the Reálné gymnasium (secondary school aimed at more technical/practical sciences) in Kladno, then continued at a similar school in Prague.

In 1906 Raymond entered Vysoká Škola Technická, the Prague Polytechnic, studying under Josef Schultz and Jan Koula. He completed his studies in Trieste in 1910 before leaving for New York City.

There, he began a three-year employment with Cass Gilbert, working on a number of projects including external architectural details for the Woolworth Building and the Austin, Nichols and Company Warehouse in Brooklyn. His experience on the latter of these gave him an insight into the structural and textural properties of concrete.

He began studying painting at the Independent School of Art in the Lincoln Square Arcade Building in 1912, but was forced to curtail a painting trip to Italy and North Africa with the onset of World War I. On his trip back to New York, he met his future wife and business partner, Noémi Pernessin, and they were wed on 15 December 1914. In early 1916 he became an American citizen, naturalizing his name, Antonín Reimann, to Antonin Raymond.

=== Employment with Frank Lloyd Wright ===
Raymond's initial encounter with the work of Frank Lloyd Wright came in 1908–1910 when he saw a small monograph and later (1910) a large portfolio of Wright's work published in Berlin. In his autobiography, Raymond recounts how deeply he and his fellow students were impressed by Wright's design: "Wright had restated the principles of building; he had overcome the cell, liberated the plan, made space flow, given buildings a human scale and blended them with nature, all in a romantic, sensual and original way that left us breathless."

Through the influence of a mutual friend, Frank Lloyd Wright agreed to employ Raymond in May 1916. Initially, Raymond and Noémi worked with Frank Lloyd Wright at Taliesin in Spring Green, Wisconsin. In 1917 he enlisted with the United States Army, serving overseas with the American Expeditionary Force. Upon his discharge from the army and his return to New York, Wright persuaded him to go to Tokyo with him to work on the Imperial Hotel.

Although he remained as Wright's chief assistant for one year, Raymond soon became bored with the work. He became concerned that "the design had nothing in common with Japan, its climate, its traditions, its people and its culture". Also, whilst his work with Gilbert showed him the great possibilities of concrete, Wright did not see concrete in the same way, preferring to encase it with brickwork or carved Oya Stone.

Although Raymond proposed continuing working for Wright, he was eventually dismissed in January 1921. In February of the same year, he set up the American Architectural and Engineering Company in Tokyo with Leon Whittaker Slack.

== Japan and the Inter-war years ==
In the Tokyo Woman's Christian College, commenced in 1924, Raymond's architecture can be seen to still be heavily influenced by Wright. Its low, hipped roof and overhanging eaves are reminiscent of Wright's Prairie Houses. This early work also demonstrates his interest in Czech Cubism and the work of Auguste Perret.

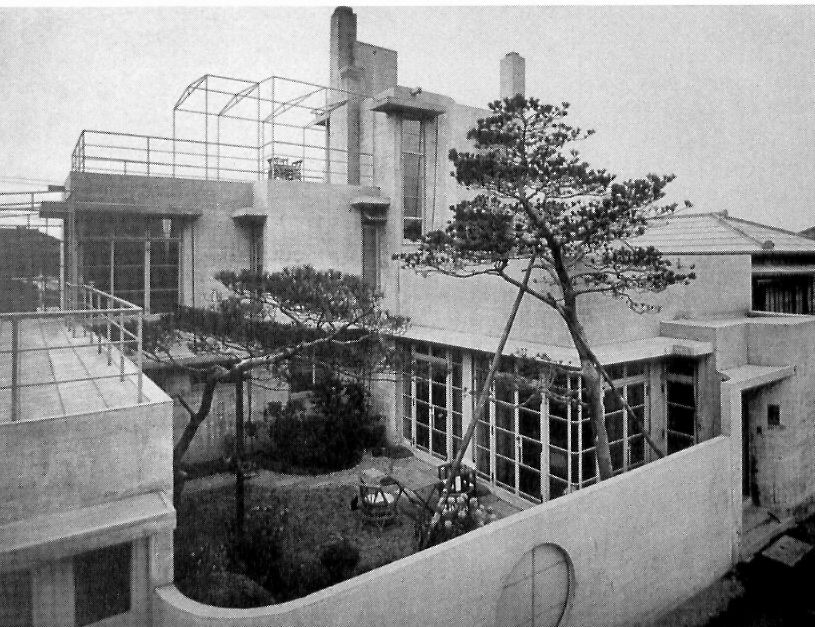
Reinanzaka House (1924)

After their own house was destroyed in the Great Kantō earthquake, Raymond designed a new one, the Reinanzaka House, in Azabu, Tokyo. His desire to free himself from Wright's influence led him to explore spatial relationships between living, working and dining areas and how spaces could be closed off with folding screens.The house is built almost entirely of in situ concrete. Raymond's workforce were enthusiastic in their use of this new material, likening it to the walls of traditional kura storehouses. The house itself had metal fenestration, tubular steel trellises and traditional rain chains rather than rainwater downpipes. The interior too was well in advance of other houses of the International Style with the use of cantilevered tubular steel furniture.

After a number of staff changes, the practice was renamed Antonin Raymond, Architect.

=== Czechoslovak Consul in Japan ===
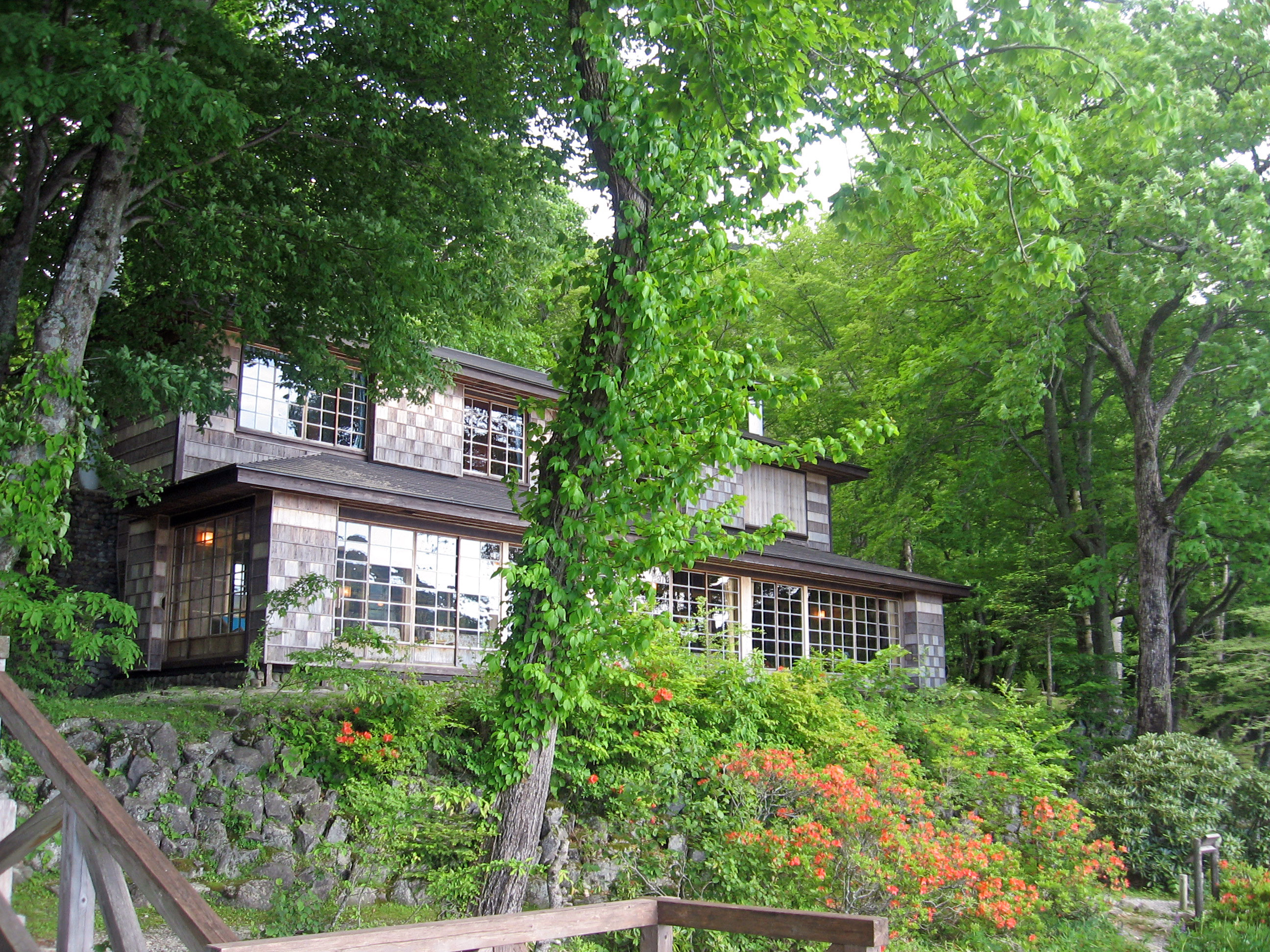
Italian embassy villa in Nikko (1928)

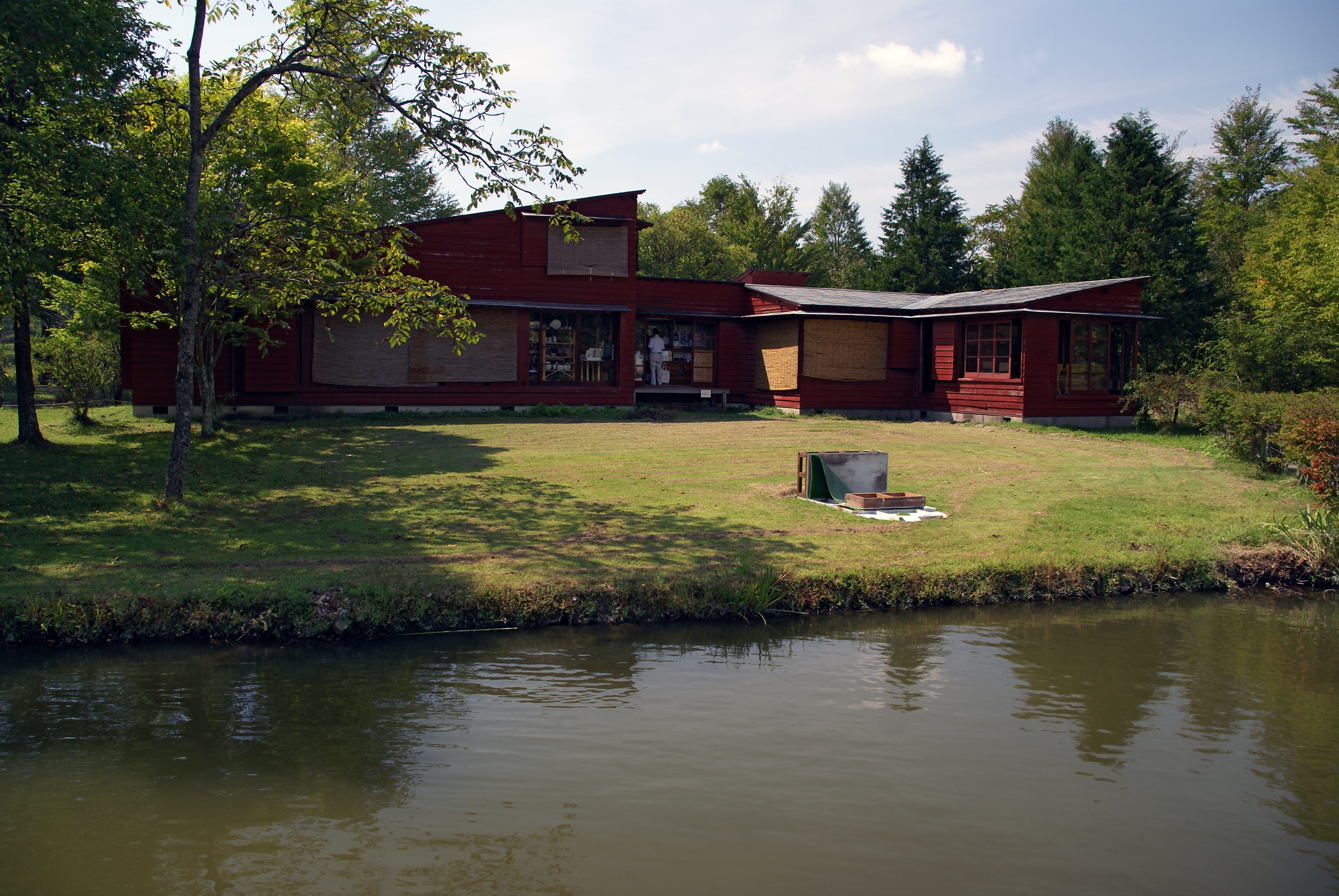
Summer House, Karuizawa (1933), today part of the Peynet Museum

Despite becoming a naturalized American citizen in 1916, Raymond became the honorary consul for the Czechoslovak Republic, representing the government of T. G. Masaryk. This gave him influence outside those circles normally associated with an architect of his age. From 1928 to 1930, Raymond designed and remodelled the American, Soviet and French embassies. He also undertook work for the Rising Sun Petroleum Company, designing 17 earthquake-proof and fireproof employee houses, the general office building, the manager's residence and two prototype service stations, one in steel and the other in concrete. All were constructed in an International Modern Style.

=== Corbusier inspiration ===
Since the Reinanzaka House, Raymond had been interested in the work of Swiss-French architect Le Corbusier. He acknowledged that further contribution of Corbusier's ideas to the practice came in 1930, when Kunio Maekawa (who had just returned from two years working for Le Corbusier in his Paris office) joined. He later applied Le Corbusier's ideas to vernacular Japanese architecture. Based upon Le Corbusier's unbuilt residential scheme for Mr. Errazuris in Chile, he designed a summer house for himself in Karuizawa, Nagano. Where Corbusier had used rough masonry and a tiled butterfly roof, Raymond used cedar with larch thatch. Although the design was criticised by an American reviewer for being a copy of Le Corbusier's design, the Frenchman was so flattered and surprised that he included a photo of it in the third volume of his Oeuvre complète:

Please be assured that there is no bitterness between us, but–as you yourself say–you made a slight mistake, that is you neglected to send me a note when you published the images of your Tokyo house, which is very pretty, by the way.

Extract of a letter from Le Corbusier to Antonin Raymond, 7 May 1935.

In 1922, Raymond had been admitted to Tokyo Golf Club and when it relocated to Asaka, Saitama in 1932, he was asked to design it. His links to golfer Shiro Akaboshi also led to several residential commissions.

In 1937 in Tokyo, Antonin, Noémi and a number of Japanese architects, including Junzō Yoshimura, signed Articles of Association forming a new firm, Reymondo Kenchiku Sekkei Jimushō.

== Sri Aurobindo Ashram ==
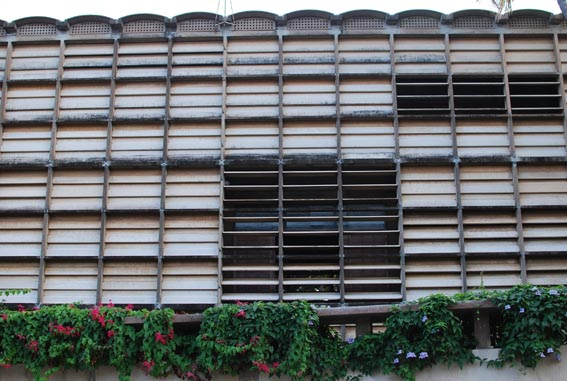
Golconde dormitory of the Sri Aurobindo Ashram in Pondicherry (1935)

In January 1938, Raymond, Noémi, and their son left Tokyo bound for America. This six-month journey took them initially to the Indian subcontinent and then on to Europe, including a trip to Prague.

In 1935, Raymond's office had accepted a commission to design a dormitory for the Sri Aurobindo Ashram in Pondicherry, part of French India in southeast India. A preliminary site visit was made by George Nakashima and the schematic design was completed in 1936. Although Raymond had envisioned that the dormitory would be completed in six months, Sri Aurobindo was concerned that the noise of construction would disturb the ashram, so he decided that the building would be constructed by its residents.

Initially, Nakashima, Francois Sammer (a Czech architect who had worked for Le Corbusier in Russia), and Chandulal (a devotee who had trained as an engineer), built a full-scale model of the dormitory in order to test the feasibility of the design, and then used it as a laboratory to further refine the construction methods. Nakashima's duties included doing very explicit detail drawings showing, for example, the design of the concrete formwork. Devotees even donated brass utensils so that they could be melted down to make door handles and hinges.

Raymond sought to mitigate the effects of the Pondicherry climate and oriented the Golconde dormitory (as it became known), so that its main facades faced north and south to make use of the prevailing breeze. A combination of moveable louvres on the exterior skin and woven teak sliding doors permitted ventilation without compromising on privacy. The building is still in use as an ashram today. It was the first modernist building in India.

== The New Hope experiment ==
In 1939, Raymond's architectural practice in the United States began with the purchase and conversion of his farm and studio in New Hope, Pennsylvania. He and his wife's goal was to "create a physical and intellectual environment that mirrored and supported their approach to modern design, one that synthesized International Style developments with lessons learned from Japan's craft tradition". They hoped that the lifestyle and design ethos that they would create, would be simpler and more in tune with nature, similar in set up to Frank Lloyd Wright's Taliesin Fellowship.

The Raymonds modified the house to create a more open plan feel, separated by Japanese fusuma partitions and shōji screens. The rooms were filled with objects of art, including rugs designed by Noémi and crockery by the Mingei designer Minagawa Masu.

Raymond developed a prospectus for aspiring architects to come and live and study at New Hope and he attracted at least 20. In addition to teaching practical design solutions, the apprentices had hands-on work with various building trades. Farm work and hay making contributed a physical aspect. Students included Junzō Yoshimura and Carl Graffunder, and the farm was visited by people like Eero Saarinen and Alvar Aalto.

Once the students had become settled, Raymond sought real-world projects for them to work upon, to put his theories into practice. Projects included an assortment of houses and extensions in New Jersey, Connecticut and Long Island.

In May 1943, the Raymonds vouched for George Nakashima and his family, releasing them from a Japanese internment camp in Idaho, so that they could come and live at the New Hope farm.

== War years (1941–1945) ==
With the approach of the Second World War, Raymond moved back to New York, ending the New Hope experiment. He formed a partnership with civil engineer Arthur Tuttle, structural engineer Elwyn Seelye and mechanical engineer Clyde Place. With the country's emphasis on the war effort, the company focused on US army contracts. Their work included: prefabricated houses at Camp Kilmer, New Jersey (1942) and Camp Shanks, New York (1942–1943) and housing and an airport in Fort Dix, New Jersey (1943). Controversially, in 1943, Raymond was asked to design a series of middle class Japanese style homes so that the Army could test the effectiveness of ordnance (specifically incendiaries) intended for use in targeted air bombing raids on Tokyo and other Japanese cities. These houses were eventually erected on the Dugway Proving Ground, nicknamed "Japanese Village". Raymond admitted in his autobiography that he was not proud of the work.

== Practice with Ladislav Rado ==
After the war, Raymond's practice with Tuttle, Seelye and Place was dissolved. He formed a new company with Slovak architect, Ladislav Leland Rado (1909–1993), and named it Raymond & Rado. Although this company lasted until Raymond's death in 1976, they practised apart, with Rado in the New York office and Raymond in Tokyo. Whilst Raymond explored pottery and sculpture (making friends with Tarō Okamoto and Ade Bethune), Rado pursued an orthogonal rationalism that Raymond would eventually distance himself from.

Rado noted Raymond has a very difficult personality, not unlike that of his mentor Frank Lloyd Wright, that often interfered with their ability to get work, stating in an interview: "He had a very large and excessive ego," was uncommonly rude, and "liked to push people around", adding "he thought he was God" and was prone to volatile outbursts in front of potential clients in the United States who voiced their own thoughts on design. Despite their contrasting personalities, which led colleagues to wonder if they would survive as a partnership, they were able to continue working together until Raymond's death.

Projects in the United States during the late 1940s allowed Raymond to gain a foothold in occupied Japan. This helped to restart the building boom there after the war. This was mainly achieved through contacts made in his previous practice and those that he and Rado made in New York.

Their single story Great River Station on the Long Island Rail Road expressed Raymond's fondness for inexpensive, simple materials. It had fieldstone retaining walls and a flat roof supported in each corner with a redwood post. The wide expanse of glazing created a modernist pavilion.

In the St. Joseph the Worker Chapel, Victorias, in the Philippines, Raymond worked with liturgical artist Ade Bethune, to produce mosaic murals and a lacquerware tabernacle inside the reinforced concrete church. The interior was adorned with colourful frescoes by Alfonso Ossorio. The church acted as a social centre for employees of the Ossorio sugar cane refinery. The church is regarded as one of the first examples of modern sacred architecture in the country.

The practice were also responsible for a number of parks and recreation buildings across the United States in the late 1940s, built largely to commemorate victory in the war.

== Reader's Digest Building ==
In 1947, Raymond petitioned General MacArthur for permission to enter occupied Japan in order to participate in the reconstruction process. His staff from Reymondo Kenchiku Sekkei Jimusho had looked after the drawings and documents of the office through the war and Raymond decided to reopen the office.

Raymond received the commission for the Reader's Digest Building from Mrs DeWitt Wallace on his return from Japan in 1949. She wanted a design that would show the best that America could offer. The site acquired for the building was opposite the Hirakawa Gate of the Imperial Palace. Its choice was treated with great resentment by the Japanese who felt that favouritism was shown by the Occupation authorities in allowing an American company to utilise a prominent site that would have served better as a park. Taking influence from Le Corbusier, Raymond responded to this criticism by masterplanning the site by using a Ville Radieuse inspired layout with the building set in gardens with sculptures by the Japanese American sculptor, Isamu Noguchi.

The long, rectilinear, two-storey building, had a double cantilevered frame supported on a single row of concrete columns. These columns tilted outwards from a vertical position. Floor to ceiling glazing on the second storey opened out onto a balcony running the length of the building. It included technical innovations from America including acoustic ceiling tiles, underfloor electricity ducts and fluorescent lighting.

It is considered the first large building in which Raymond managed to use his principles of simplicity, economy of materials, elegance and lightness learned from his residential works. Raymond cited the design of the Hiroshima Peace Museum by Kenzo Tange as being an external imitation of the Reader's Digest Building.

Despite winning awards when first completed, the Reader's Digest Building was demolished in 1963 to be replaced by the nine-floor Palaceside Building, a mixed used office building designed by Shōji Hayashi that for many years has served as the headquarters of the Mainichi Newspaper.

== Experimentation in Tokyo ==
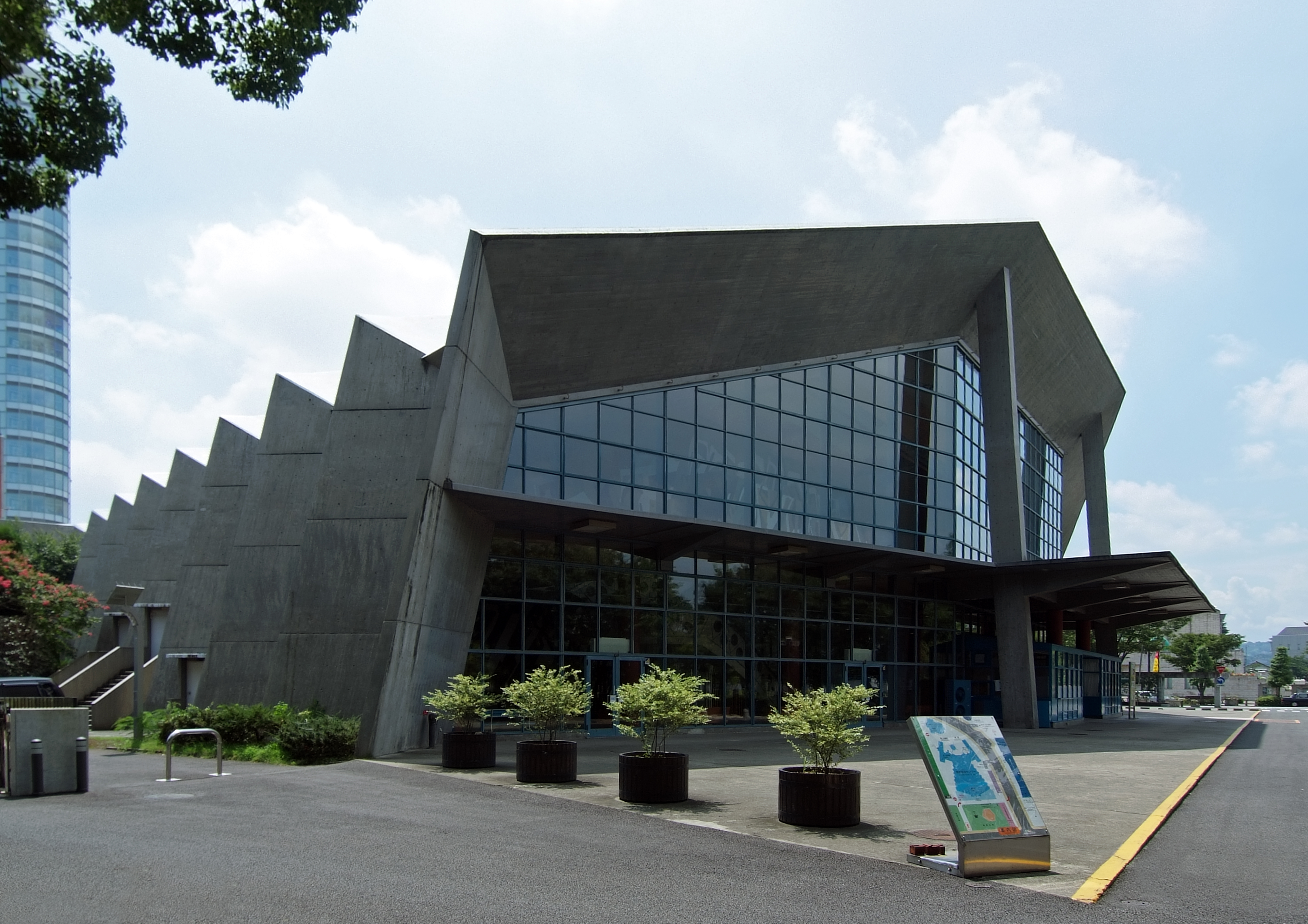
Gunma Music Center (1955–1961)

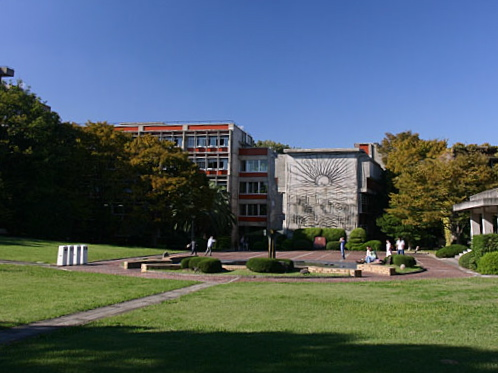
Nanzan University campus in Nagoya (1964)

Raymond purchased land in the Nishi Azabu district of Tokyo to build his new office and living quarters. The office was built using the traditional Japanese post and lintel type construction using unplaned timber logs. The office served as a proving ground for the latest American building innovations including veneered plywood and suspended metal ductwork for forced air heating. Taking influence from Le Corbusier's modulor, Raymond used the traditional Japanese module of the ken (based upon the size of tatami mats) as a unit of measure to set out the building's structure. Again he used fusuma partitions and shoji screens, but in a modern way to divide up the spaces.

Raymond sought to use the design and construction of the office as a platform to inform prototype dwellings for the post war reconstruction of Japan.

In 1955, Raymond began a commission in Takasaki, Gunma Prefecture for a Music Centre to house the Gunma Symphony Orchestra. Out of respect for the historic site and the budget constraints, he designed a building built on three premises: it would have an economical structural system, there would be equality of sight lines and acoustics for each seat, and the building would have a low profile without a fly tower. Raymond achieved these aims by using a series of 12 centimetres (4.7 in) thick, reinforced concrete ribs connected together like an accordion and spanning 60 metres (200 ft).

In 1961, he was commissioned to design the Catholic-based Nanzan University in Nagoya. It was one of the largest projects that he would undertake. The campus was orientated on a north–south axis across rolling hills and the eight buildings were arranged to suit the topography and harmonise with the landscape. In-situ concrete is used throughout the scheme and each building has its own concrete form, some with pilotis, others with shells.

Located to the east of the Nanzan Campus is the Divine Word Seminary Chapel (1962). This is a building that exploits the plastic capacity of concrete, with two intersecting shells forming a bell tower. These are punctured with vertical slots which allow light to radiate along the curved interior walls.

== Influence of his wife Noémi Raymond ==
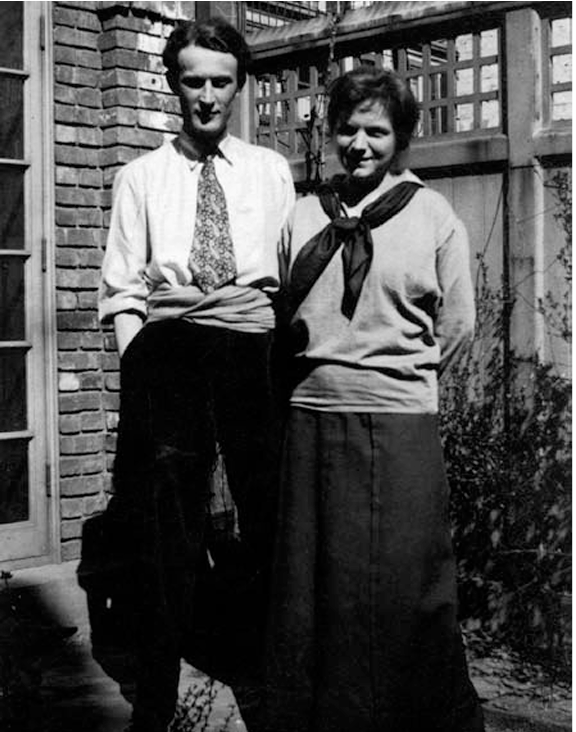
Antonin Raymond and Noémi Pernessin in New York, ca. 1914

Born in 1889 in Cannes to Swiss-French parents, Noémi moved to New York in 1900, and later studied Fine Art and Philosophy at Columbia Teachers College. Here, she was influenced by the painter and educator Arthur Wesley Dow. During Raymond's period of training as a painter, Noémi supported them both by doing graphic work for publications like the New York Sun and New York Herald Tribune. When they both moved to Taliesin she became interested in 3D design. She also polished her knowledge of Japanese crafts, becoming a broker for clients such as Rudolph Schindler's wife, Pauline Gibling.

Noémi's influence on Raymond during the inter-war years was substantial. She encouraged him to break away from Wright's rigid style and explore the design of the Reinanzaka House. She increased her interest in Japanese art and philosophy, including ukiyo-e woodblock prints and introduced Raymond to various influential people, including the mystic philosopher Rudolf Steiner.

She expanded her design repertoire to include textiles, rugs, furniture, glass and silverware. Noémi exhibited in Tokyo in 1936 and New York in 1940, and her textiles were chosen by American designers like Louis Kahn to cover furniture in their designs.

Noémi also contributed to the design of the studio in Nishiazabu and a series of Raymond's villas during the 1950s, including the Hayama Villa (1958).

== Legacy in concrete ==
Ignored by Henry-Russell Hitchcock, Jr and Philip Johnson in their curatorial celebration of the International Style in 1932, and despite the homecoming exhibition of his work staged in the Rockefeller Center in 1939 and the AIA New York Chapter Medal of Honor that was awarded to him 17 years later in 1956, one has the feeling that Raymond's achievements were always somehow grudgingly received by his compatriots. And even now, over 50 years later... there remains a silent consensus in the field that is reluctant to acknowledge the unrivalled excellence and breathtaking scope of Raymond's architectural career.

— Kenneth Frampton

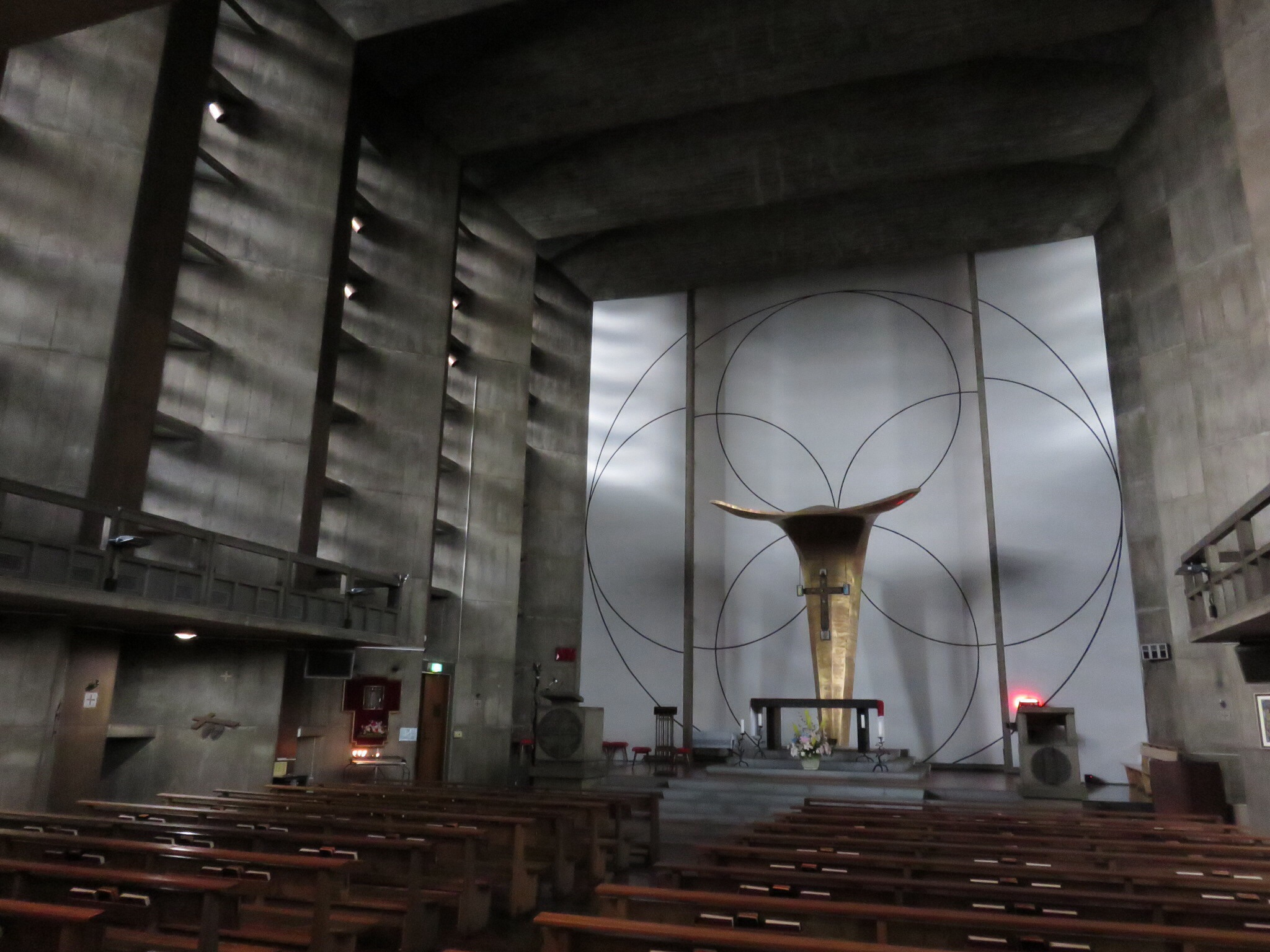
Interior of St. Anselm's Church, Tokyo (1954)

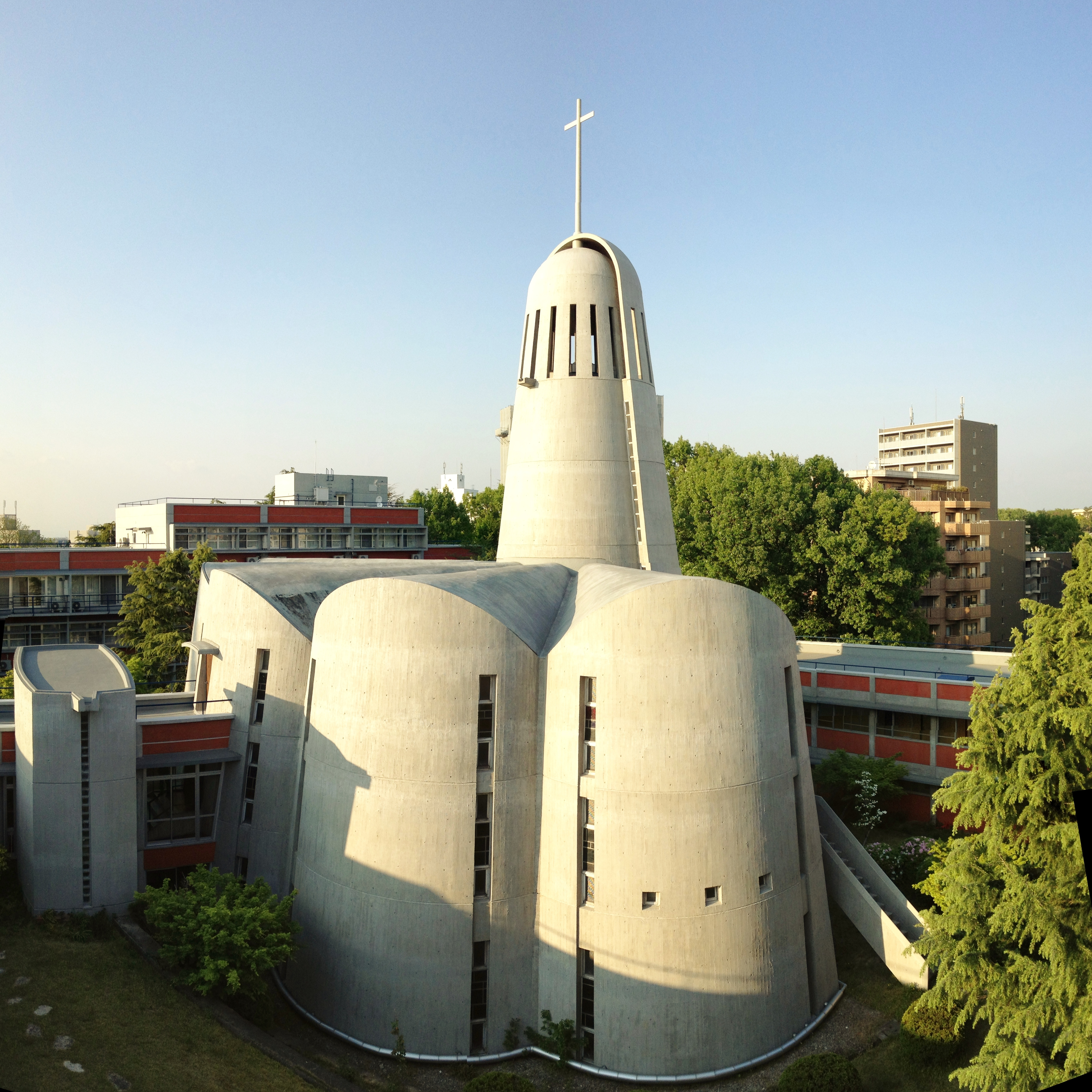
Divine Word Seminary Chapel of Nanzan University, Nagoya (1962)

When Wright left, Raymond set up his own office, he advertised himself as a specialist in reinforced concrete. He was aware of its textural properties from Cass Gilbert, its structural ones from Wright, and its benefits in relation to earthquake proofing. His first major independent project in 1921 was to design Hoshi Pharmaceutical School, which was one of the first reinforced concrete buildings in Tokyo. Raymond used precast concrete to form decorative elements for the building, such as window mullions. In a partially successful experiment, he used wooden formwork to imprint a texture onto the concrete (but he chose to cover it up).

On the Reinanzaka House, the labourers were skilled in the use of wood, and helped Raymond engrain the texture of cedar onto the concrete. This was further explored on the Tetsuma Akaboshi and the Morinosuke Kawasaki houses, where the concrete walls of the luxurious interiors were imprinted with cypress textures. On the Karuizawa Studio, workmen polished the concrete with sand and straw to reveal the texture of the aggregate. Whilst at Nanzan University, the south facing facades were cast with checkerboard patterns, with applied metalwork casting abstract shadows on the surface.

Raymond's techniques endeared him to the Japanese architectural psyche, and in 1958, the editor of the architectural magazine Shinkenchiku, Yoshioka Yasugoro remarked, "it is doubtful that concrete is handled with such pains anywhere except in Japan. The idea of an exposed concrete surface seems to fit in with Japanese ideas of decor." Post war architects like Tadao Ando have become famous for their use of exposed concrete.

Raymond's use of a traditional post and beam structure in concrete for the Reinanzaka House was a technique that was adopted by post war Japanese architects such as Kenzo Tange.

Predating Le Corbusier's work in Chandigarh, the Golconde dormitory used a monolithic concrete structure with deep overhangs and louvres to adapt to specific climatic conditions. The building pioneered the use of reinforced concrete in India.

Although Raymond's technique of exposing and perfecting concrete surfaces would come to be seen as "typically Japanese" over time, it is important to note that this entailed polishing and waterproofing the exposed surface rather than covering it with white tiles.

— Ken Tadashi Oshima

Antonin Raymond died at St. Mary's Hospital in Langhorne, Pennsylvania, on 25 October 1976, aged 88. His wife Noémi died four years later, aged 91. Raymond Architectural Design Office continues to practice in Tokyo.

== Selected works ==
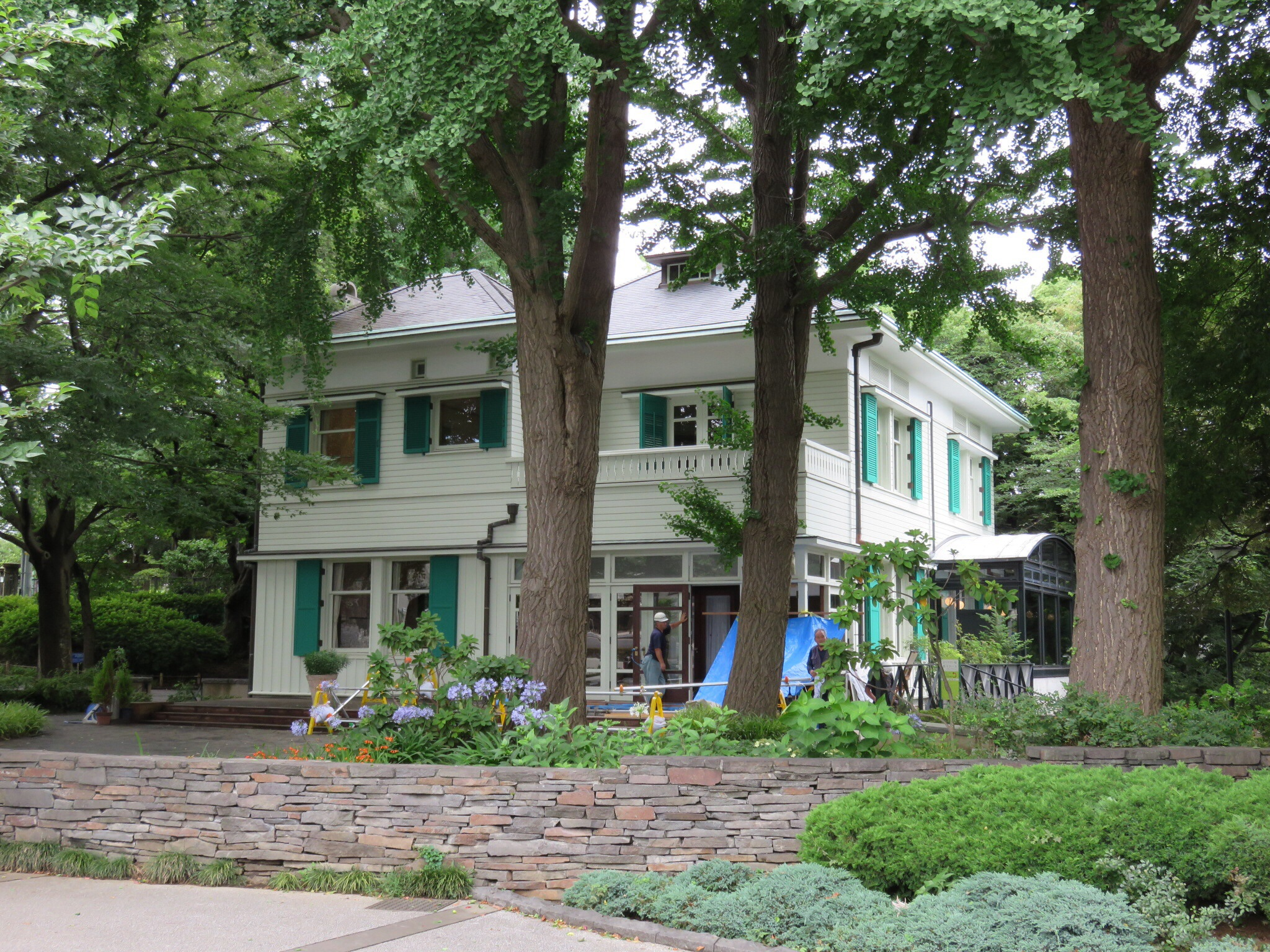
Ehrismann Residence, Yamate (1927)

- Tokyo Woman's Christian College, Tokyo (1921–1938)
- Reinanzaka House, Tokyo (1924)
- Hoshi University Main Building, Tokyo (1924)
- Ehrismann Residence, Yamate, Yokohama (1927)
- The American School in Japan, Meguro Campus, Tokyo (1927)
- Italian Embassy Villa, Nikko (1929)
- Troedsson Villa, Nikko (1931)
- Tokyo Golf Club, Asaka (1932)
- Summer House, Karuizawa (1933)
- Akeboshi Tetsuma House, Tokyo (1933)
- Morinosuke Kawasaki House, Tokyo (1934)
- Tokyo Woman's Christian College Chapel/Auditorium (1934)
- Raymond Farm, New Hope (1939)
- The Huyler Building, Buffalo, New York (interior) (1939–1940)
- St. Joseph the Worker Church, Victorias City, Negros, the Philippines (1949)
- Raymond House and Studio, Azabu (1951)
- Reader's Digest Offices, Tokyo (1951)
- Cunningham House, Tokyo (1954)
- St. Anselm's Church, Tokyo (1954)
- Yawata Steel Otani Gymnasium, KitaKyushu (1955), (GoogleEarth 33.862184,130.806841)
- Yaskawa Head Offices, KitaKyushu, (1954)
- St. Alban's Church, Tokyo (1956)
- Hayama Villa, Hayama (1958)
- Moji Golf Club, KitaKyushu (1959)
- St. Michael's Church, Sapporo (1960)
- New Studio, Karuizawa (1962)
- St. Paul Church, Shiki (1963)
- St. Paul's Chapel, Rikkyo Niiza Junior and Senior High School, Niiza Campus, Saitama (1963)
- Nanzan University Campus (1964)
- Chapel and Lecture Hall, Rikkyo Boys Primary School, Tokyo (1966)

== Awards ==
- 1952 Architectural Institute of Japan Award for the Reader's Digest Building
- 1956 Medal of Honor by the New York Chapter of American Institute of Architects
- 1957 First Honor Award of the American Institute of Architects and the Yawata Steel Worker's Union Memorial Hall Award of Merit
- 1964 Third Class, Order of the Rising Sun by Emperor Hirohito
- 1965 Design Award from the Architectural Institute of Japan for his design of Nanzan University, Nagoya

== Publications ==
- 1935 Antonin Raymond: His Work in Japan 1920–1935 published by Jônan Shoin, Tokyo
- 1938 Architectural Details published by the International Architectural Association, Tokyo
- 1962 The Works of Antonin Raymond Architectural Association Journal
- 1967 Watakushi to nihon kenchiku (Myself and Japanese Architecture) A collection of writings and lectures, published by Kajima Shuppansha, Tokyo
- 1970 Jiden (autobiography) published in Japanese by Kajima Shuppansha, Tokyo
- 1973 Antonin Raymond: An Autobiography published by Charles E. Tuttle Company of Rutland, Vermont and Tokyo, Japan

== See also ==
- Czech Republic–Japan relations
- Junzō Yoshimura
