= Noémi Raymond =

French-born American artist and designer

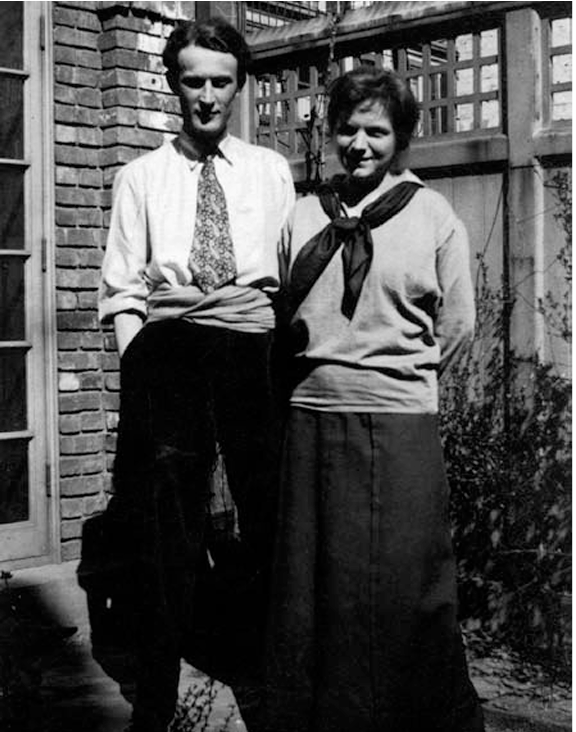
- Noémi Pernessin Raymond and Antonin Raymond in New York, circa 1914
- Born: June 23, 1889; Cannes, France,
- Died: August 19, 1980 (aged 90)

Noémi Pernessin Raymond (also spelled Noemi; June 23, 1889 – August 19, 1980) was a French-born American artist and designer who spent much of her career in Japan. Her work included painting, sculpture, graphic design and illustration, furniture, rug and textile design as well as interior design.

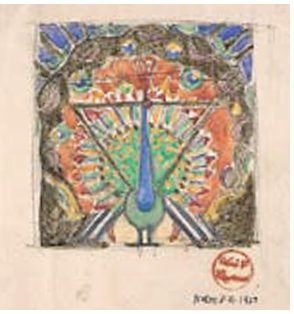
Noémi Pernessin Raymond, study of peacock mural for the Imperial Hotel, Tokyo, 1920, pencil, watercolor, and gold leaf.

== Life ==
Born in Cannes, France, Raymond moved to New York with her family around age 12. She graduated from Columbia University where she studied under John Dewey and Arthur Wesley Dow who introduced her to Japanese art and design. She later studied painting at the Académie de la Grande Chaumière in Paris.

As World War I threatened, Raymond returned to America. On the voyage in August, 1914, she met Czech-born Antonin Raymond who became her design partner and husband. They married in NYC on December 13, 1914. It was her art-world connections which led to her and Antonin working for Frank Lloyd Wright from May–December, 1916.

Noémi and Antonin worked with Wright at Taliesin and, after Antonin was discharged from the US army at the end of WWI, accompanied Wright to Japan in 1919 to work on the design of the Imperial Hotel in Tokyo. After leaving the Imperial Hotel project in 1921, Noémi and her husband remained and worked in Japan until 1938; they returned again after World War II, working in Japan from 1947 or 1948 to 1973.

== Designs ==
Together Noémi and her husband worked together on over 500 structures in Japan, India, South East Asia, Europe and the United States, including houses, schools, factories, embassies, churches, etc. Committed modernists, their style combined modern European design with international folk craft traditions. She and Antonin gained recognition as one of the earliest practitioners of the International Style in Asia.

Trained as an artists/designer, Raymond's interest in 3-D design grew as she worked with her architect husband. In 1916, while working with Frank Lloyd Wright at Taliesen, she realized the importance that furnishings played in manipulating space along with knitting together structures. Noémi went on to design the interiors of many of Antonin’s architectural projects.

While living in Japan in the 1920s, Raymond learned about Japanese craft working as an export broker for various Japanese goods such as lacquerware, ceramics, baskets, and textiles. She worked with Mita Heibonji who taught her the techniques of wood block printing and sumi-e calligraphy as well as an appreciation for folk art, which complemented the Raymonds interest in Japanese rural farmhouse (minka).

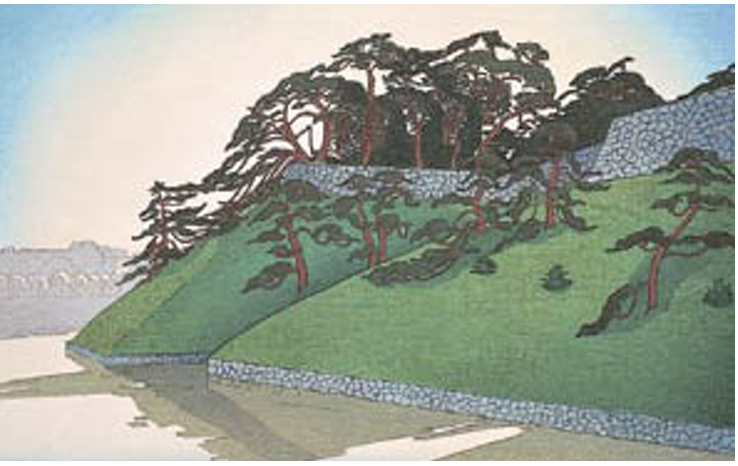
Noémi Pernessin Raymond, Imperial Palace Moat, woodblock print, ca. 1920s

== Work in Japan ==
Noémi Raymond's textile design shows the influence of Japanese block-print textiles of the 1930s. She and her husband observed in 1935: "The doing away with all but essentials, or discipline, is the basis of Japanese charm... All is the direct result of a necessity, be it material or spiritual."

Furniture design earned Noémi Raymond praise from her contemporaries. Tasked with blending East and West in a minka-inspired living room by golf course designer Akaboshi Shiro, the artist created "tubular metal chairs" upholstered to mimic "traditional Japanese weaving." Noémi Raymond's insight applied to artistic trends as much as it did to daily life, evident by her inclusion of strategically placed mirrors in the Akaboshi home which allowed his wife to monitor the children from her bedroom.
