= George Nakashima House, Studio and Workshop =

Historic house in Pennsylvania, United States

- U.S. National Register of Historic Places
- U.S. National Historic Landmark
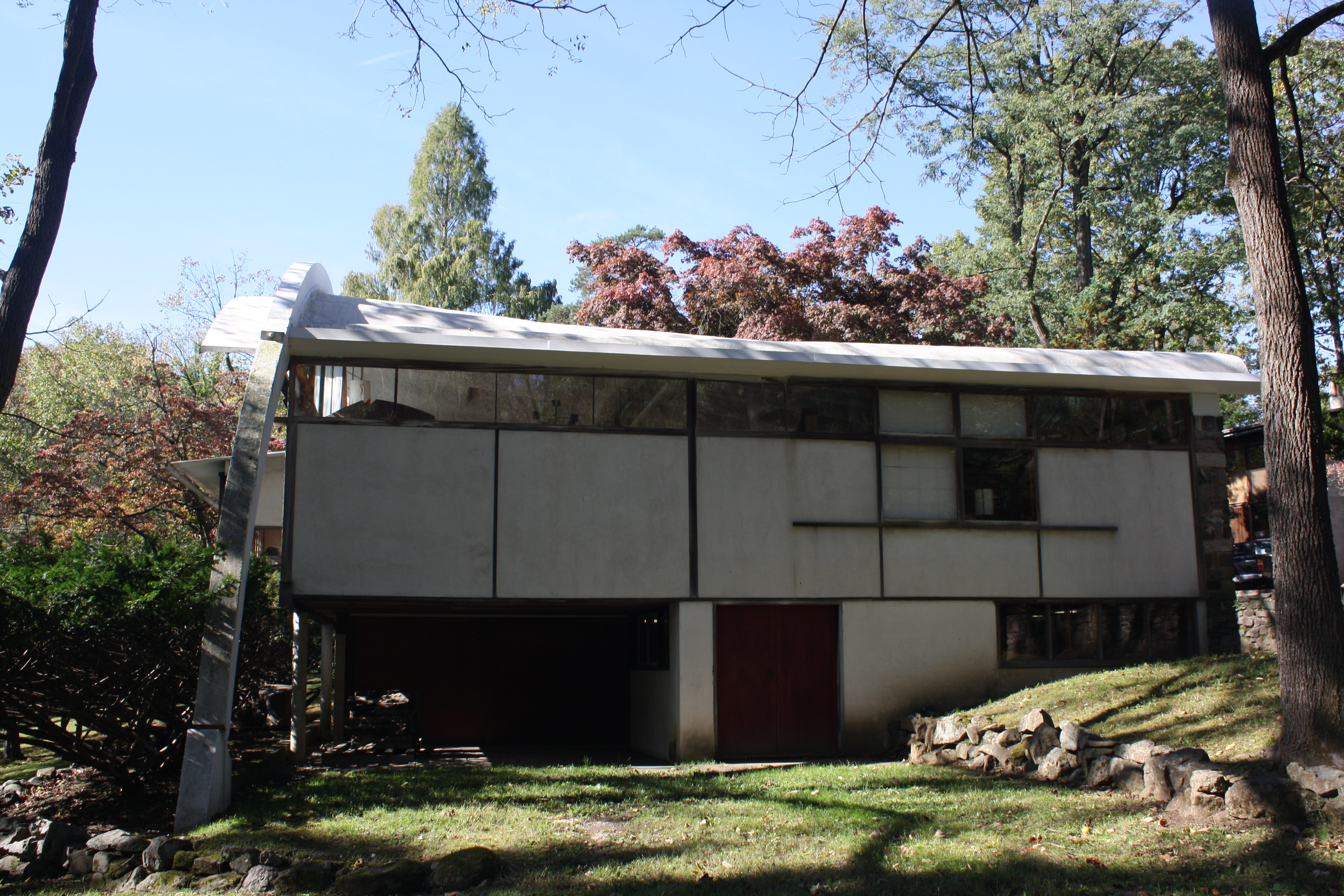
- Conoid Studio

- Location within Pennsylvania Location within the United States
- Location: 1847 and 1858 Aquetong Rd., Solebury Township, Pennsylvania
- Coordinates: 40°20′24.7″N 74°57′20.1″W
- Area: 12.2 acres (4.9 ha)
- NRHP reference No.: 08000782

Significant dates
- Added to NRHP: August 14, 2008
- Designated NHL: April 23, 2014

The George Nakashima House, Studio and Workshop is a historic artist's compound at 1847 and 1858 Aquetong Rd. in Solebury Township, Bucks County, Pennsylvania. The compound consists of houses and studio buildings designed and built by artist George Nakashima (1905–1990), which served as family homes and as his studio space. The studio-related buildings are open to the public for tours; the houses of the compound continue to serve as residences of the Nakashima family. In April 2014 it was also designated a National Historic Landmark. The site was listed on the World Monument Fund's 2014 Endangered Sites Watchlist.

== Description ==
The Nakashima complex is located in a rural setting south of the town of New Hope, Pennsylvania, on both sides of Aquetong Road south of Windy Bush Road in Solebury Township. The property consists of more than 12 acres (4.9 ha), set near the top of a south-facing hillside. The compound includes a total of eighteen buildings, seven of which are primarily residential, while the others serve roles in the production and distribution of Nakashima's furniture and art. Four of the residential structures, located on the north side of Aquetong Road, form a complex Nakashima built for his daughter Mira, and are not open to the public. On the south side of the road, surrounded on three sides by studio buildings, is a residential compound consisting of the main house, a garage, a heating house, and lanai. All of these buildings are in a basically International Style of architecture, infused with Japanese elements.

The main buildings of the studio are the Conoid Studio and the Arts Building. The Conoid Building, which Nakashima built in 1960, is a distinctive rectangular single-story building with a concrete roof in the shape of a sinusoidal wave that gradually flattens toward the south. The walls are fashioned out of a variety of materials, including stone, concrete, cement blocks, and glass. The roof form gives the building interior a large open area, with sections carved out by wood framing for the kitchen, bathrooms, and office. The Arts Building was built by Nakashima in 1967 as a gallery space to showcase the works of Ben Shahn. It is 2 1/2 stories in height and is topped by a parabolic roof formed out of plywood and covered in asphalt shingles. It now also displays the works of Nakashima.

Eight buildings of the complex are open for tours; donations are requested.

== Gallery ==
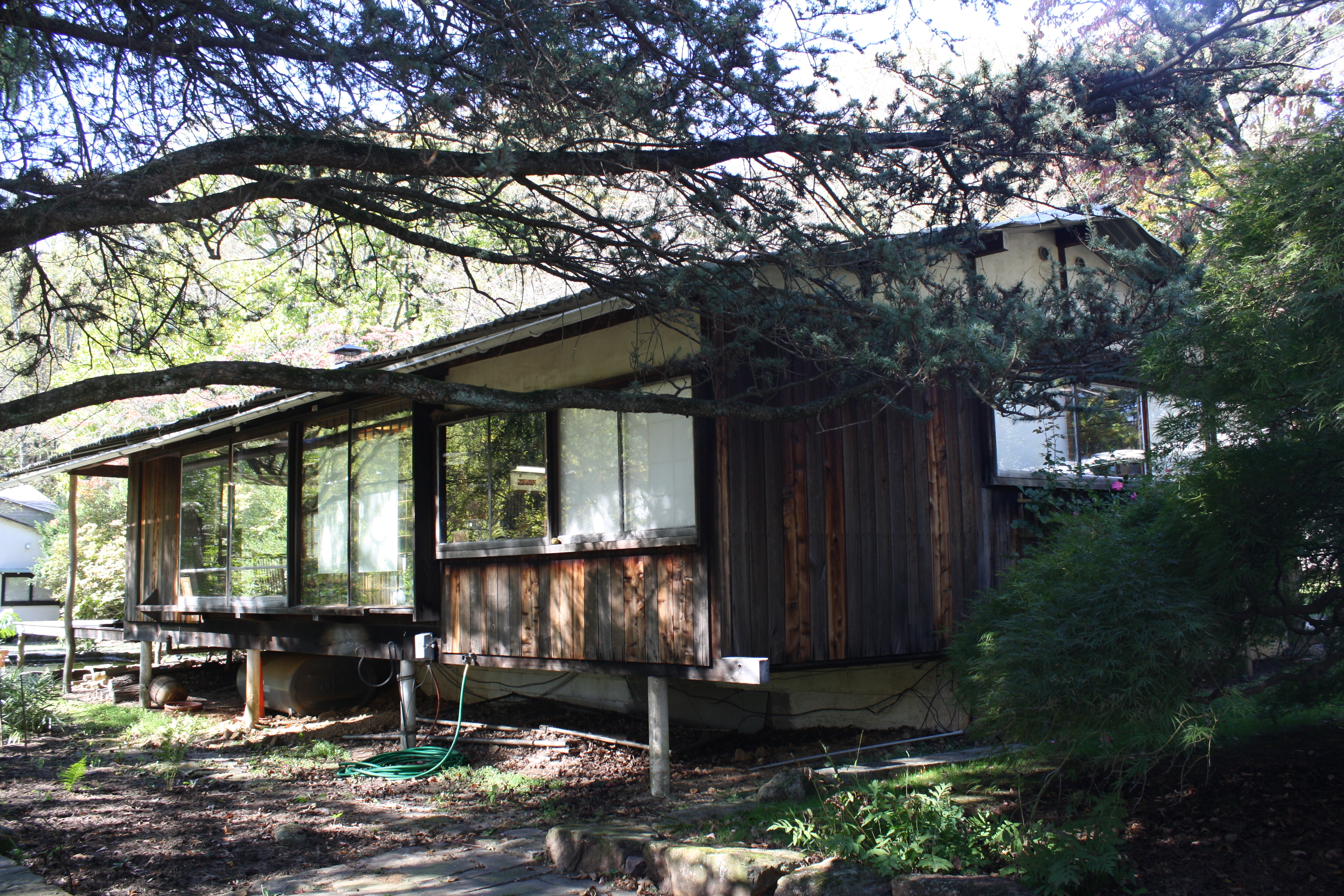
Showroom.

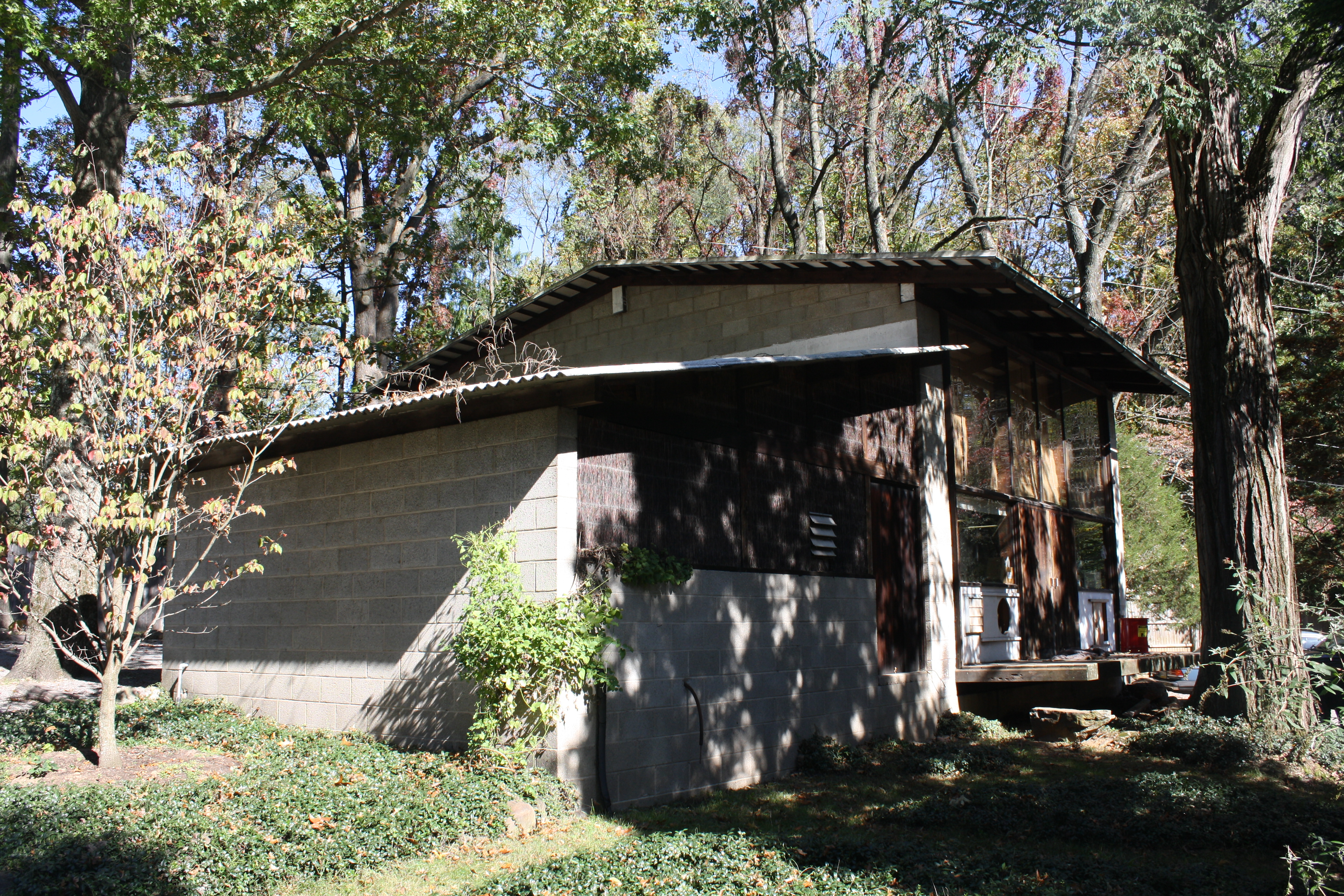
Finishing Department.

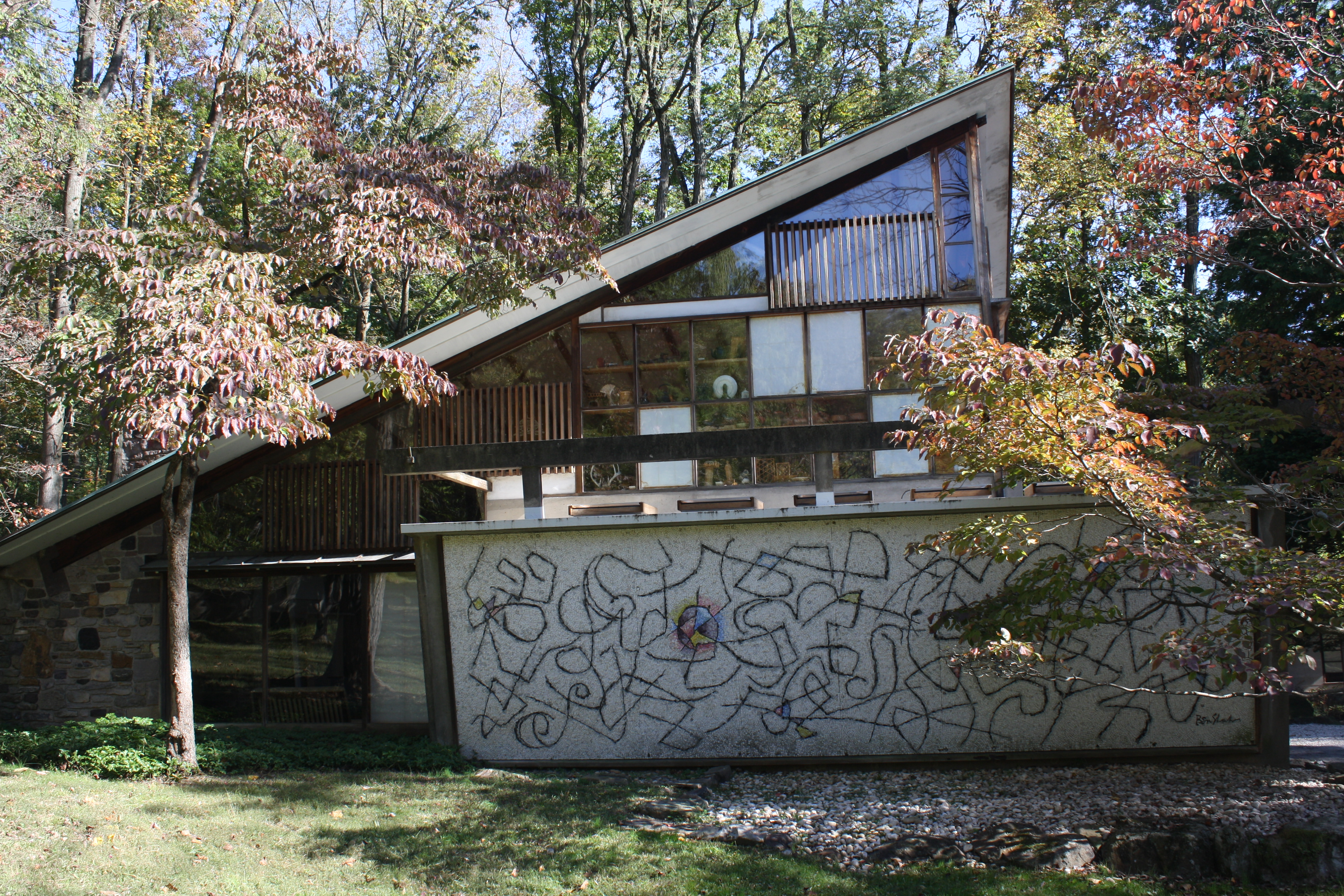
Arts Building.

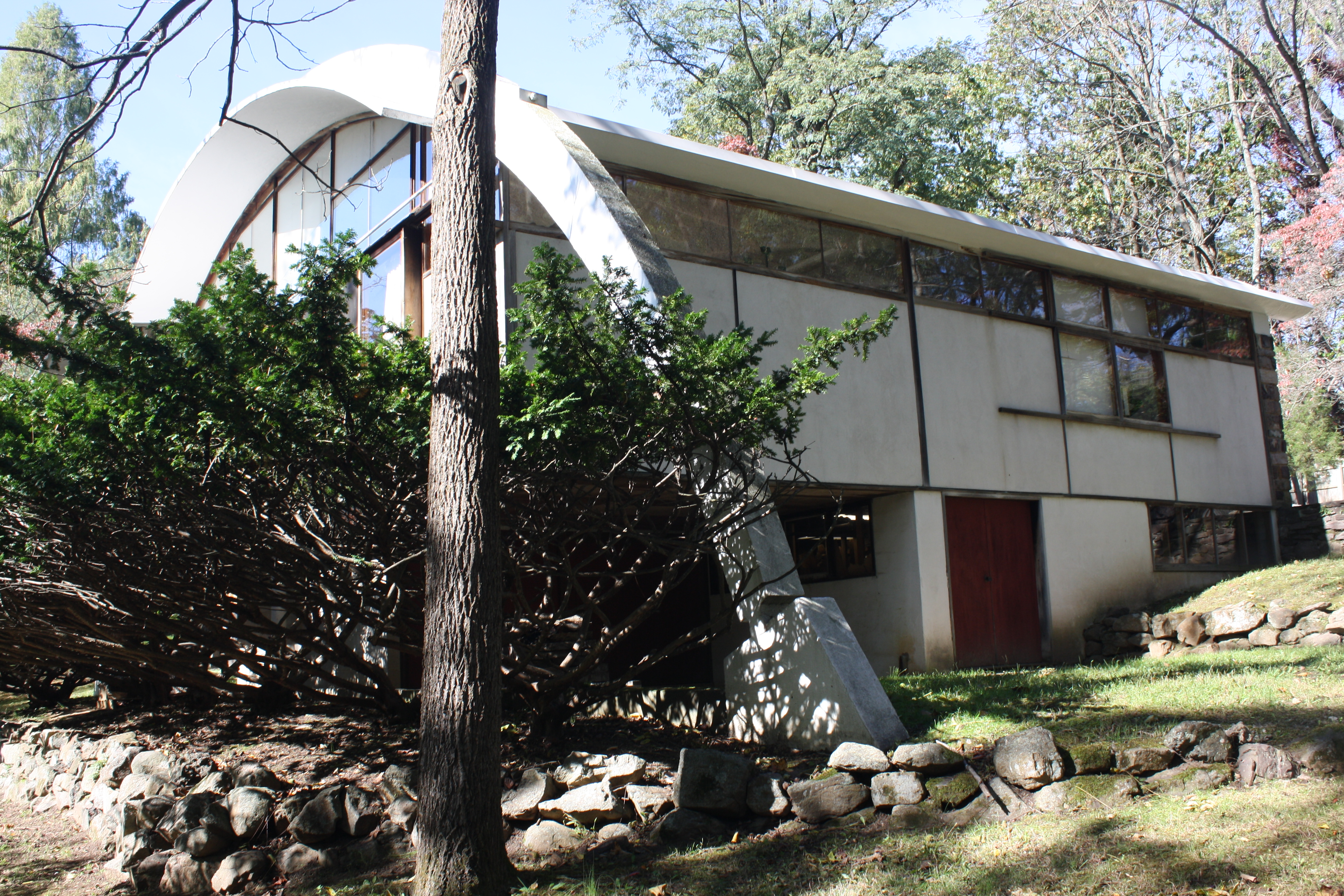
Studio.

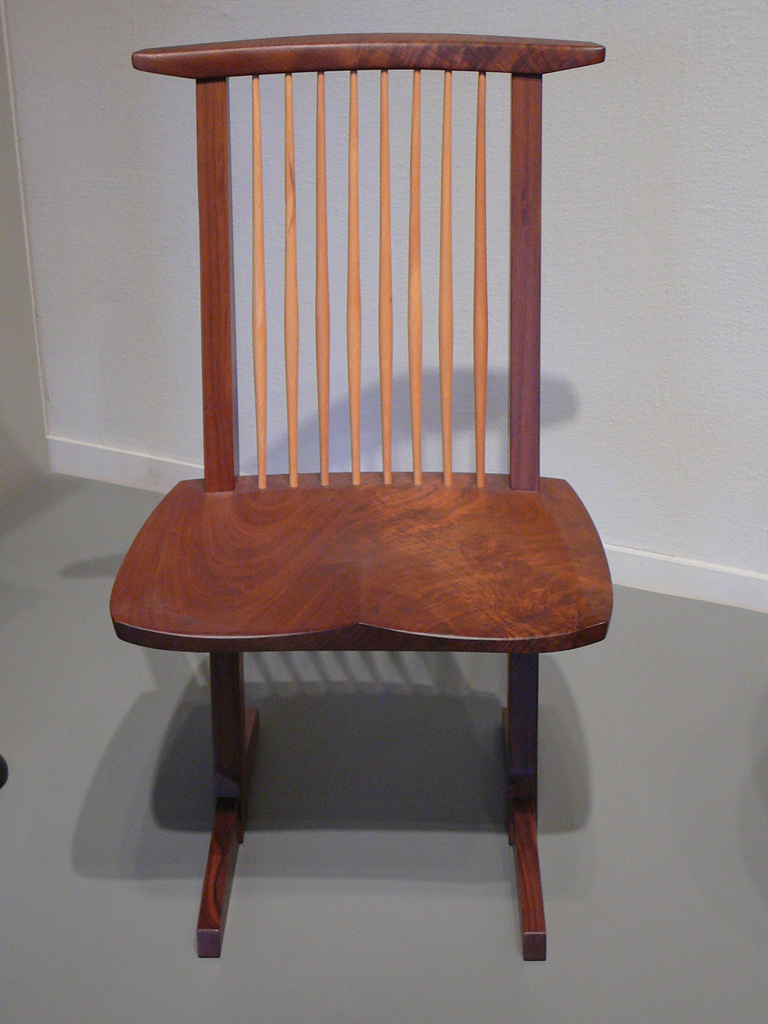
Conoid Chair by George Nakashima

== See also ==
- List of National Historic Landmarks in Pennsylvania
- National Register of Historic Places listings in Bucks County, Pennsylvania
