= George Nakashima =

American architect (1905–1990)

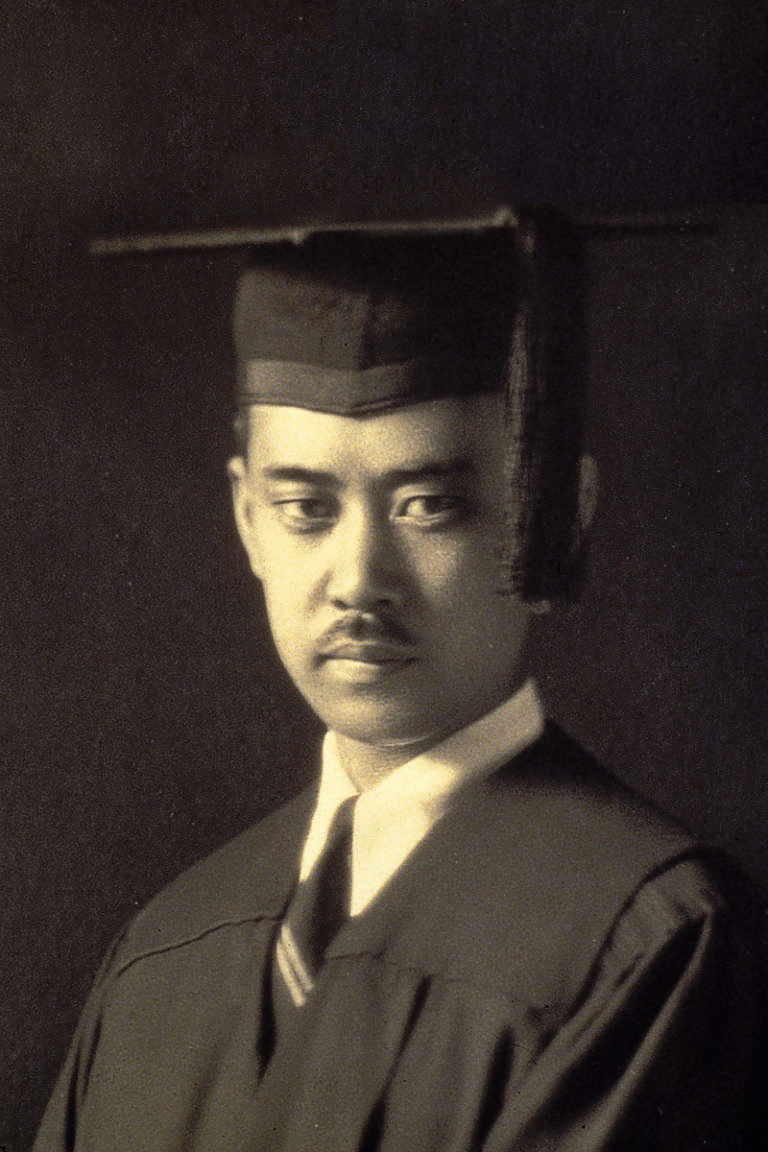
- Nakashima in 1929
- Born: George Katsutoshi Nakashima; May 24, 1905; Spokane, Washington, US
- Died: June 15, 1990 (aged 85); New Hope, Pennsylvania, US
- Education: Gentaro Hikogawa (1942)
- Known for: Furniture and woodworking designer, architect
- Movement: American craft movement
- Spouse: Marion Okajima
- Children: Mira Nakashima; Kevin Katsuya Nakashima
- Awards: Order of the Sacred Treasure; 1983

George Katsutoshi Nakashima (Japanese: 中島勝寿 Nakashima Katsutoshi, May 24, 1905 – June 15, 1990) was an American woodworker and architect. In 1983, he accepted the Order of the Sacred Treasure, an honor bestowed by the Emperor of Japan and the Japanese government.

== Early life ==
Nakashima was born in 1905 in Spokane, Washington, to Katsuharu and Suzu Nakashima. He enrolled in the University of Washington program in architecture, graduating with a Bachelor of Architecture (B.Arch) in 1929. In 1931, after earning a master's degree in architecture from M.I.T., Nakashima sold his car and purchased a round-the-world tramp steamship ticket. He spent a year in France working odd jobs to fund an artist's lifestyle. In Paris he was introduced to architect Le Corbusier, the two bonding over their views on the architect’s moral obligation to society and the practice as a spiritual activity. He then went on to North Africa and eventually to Japan.

While in Japan, Nakashima went to work for Antonin Raymond, an American architect who had collaborated with Frank Lloyd Wright on the Imperial Hotel. While working for Raymond, Nakashima toured Japan extensively, studying the subtleties of Japanese architecture and design. During this period he met Marion Okajima, who would become his wife. While working for Raymond, Nakashima worked as the project architect for the Golconde Dormitory in Pondicherry, India, supervising construction from 1937 to 1939 and immersing himself in the spiritual teachings of the Aurobindo sect. In 1964, Gira Sarabhai, invited Nakashima to Ahmedabad. He spent three weeks in NID's wood workshop, designing chairs, benches, tables, ottomans, lounges, daybeds, shelves and mirror frames. They were kept in production in limited numbers at the institute by referring to the detailed drawings and instructions left by Nakashima, until about 1975, when Sarabhai stepped down.

== Woodworking ==
External videos
- 1971 George Nakashima Conoid Bench, 3:40
- George Nakashima Walnut Trestle Table & Sketch, ca. 1955, 2:58
- 1974 Signed George Nakashima End Table, 3:05, all on Antiques Road Show, PBS

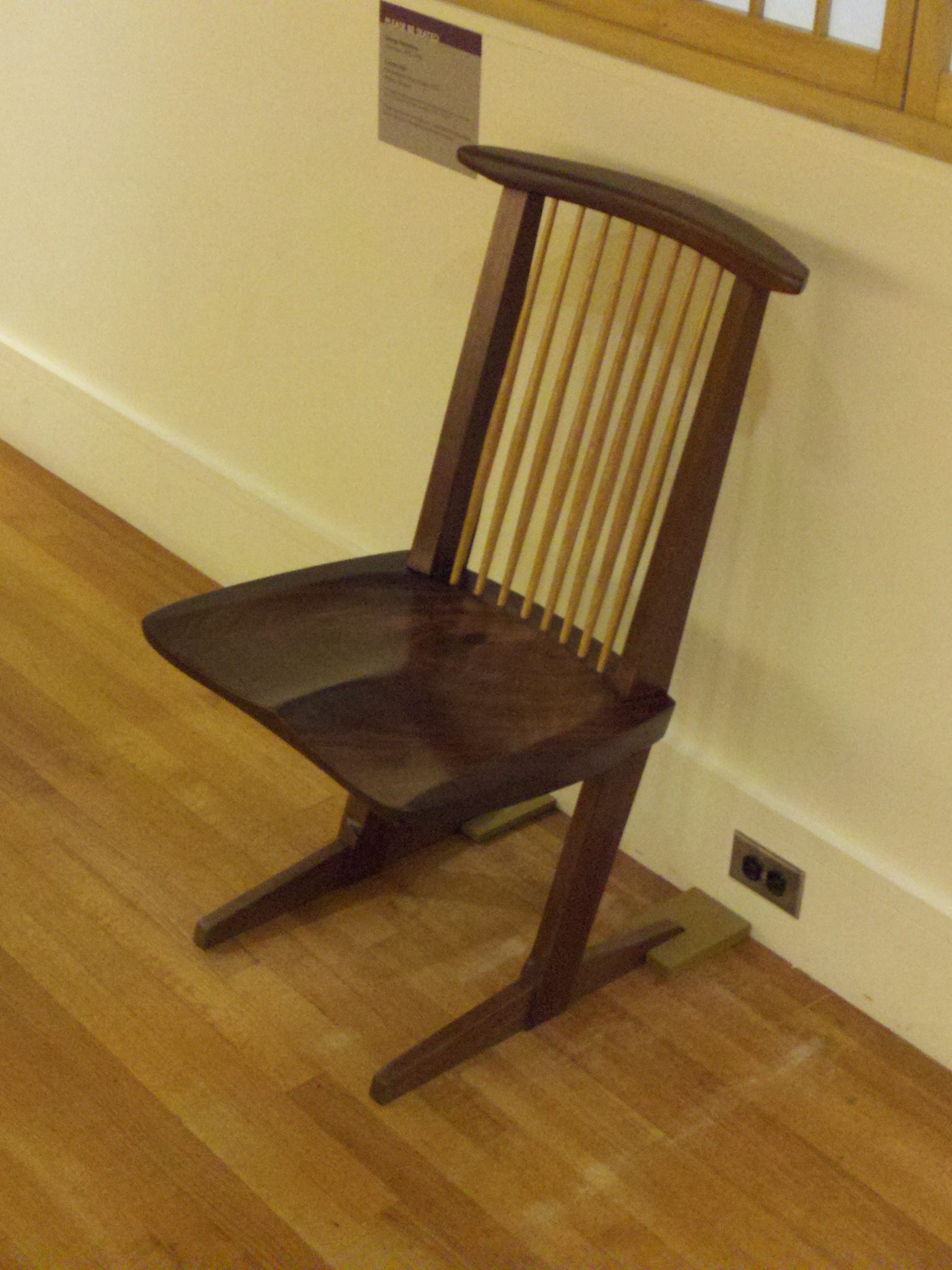
George Nakashima chair

In 1937, Raymond's company was commissioned to build a dormitory at an ashram in Puducherry, India for which Nakashima was the primary construction consultant. It was here that Nakashima made his first furniture.

Conoid Bench (1977) by George Nakashima at the Renwick Gallery in Washington, DC in 2022

In 1940, Nakashima returned to America and began to make furniture and teach woodworking in Seattle. He was interned during the Second World War, like others of Japanese ancestry, being sent to Camp Minidoka in Hunt, Idaho, in March 1942. At the camp he met Gentaro (sometimes spelled Gentauro) Hikogawa, a man trained in traditional Japanese carpentry. Under his tutelage, Nakashima learned to master traditional Japanese hand tools and joinery techniques. Perhaps more significantly, he began to approach woodworking with discipline and patience, striving for perfection in every stage of construction.

Nakashima's signature woodworking design was his large-scale tables made of large wood slabs with smooth tops but unfinished natural edges, consisting of multiple slabs connected with butterfly joints. Nakashima, along with the Danish furniture maker Tage Frid, Swedish James Krenov, and Americans Wharton Esherick and Art Carpenter, are considered to be among the "first generation" of Studio Furniture makers and are cited as highly influential to the field of contemporary woodworking.

== New Hope inspiration ==
In 1943, Antonin Raymond successfully sponsored Nakashima's release from the camp and invited him to his farm to work as a chicken farmer in New Hope, Pennsylvania. In his studio and workshop at New Hope, Nakashima explored the organic expressiveness of wood and choosing boards with knots and burls and figured grain. He designed furniture lines for Knoll, including the Straight Back Chair (which is still in production), and Widdicomb-Mueller as he continued his private commissions. The studio grew incrementally until Nelson Rockefeller commissioned 200 pieces for his house in Pocantico Hills, New York, in 1973.

Nakashima cited diverse inspirations for his work including the Japanese tea ceremony, American Shaker furniture, and the Zen Buddhist ideals of beauty. Nakashima self-identified as a "Hindu Catholic Shaker Japanese American." Drawing on Japanese designs and shop practices, as well as on American and International Modern styles, Nakashima created a body of work that would make his name synonymous with the best of 20th century American Art furniture.

== Legacy ==
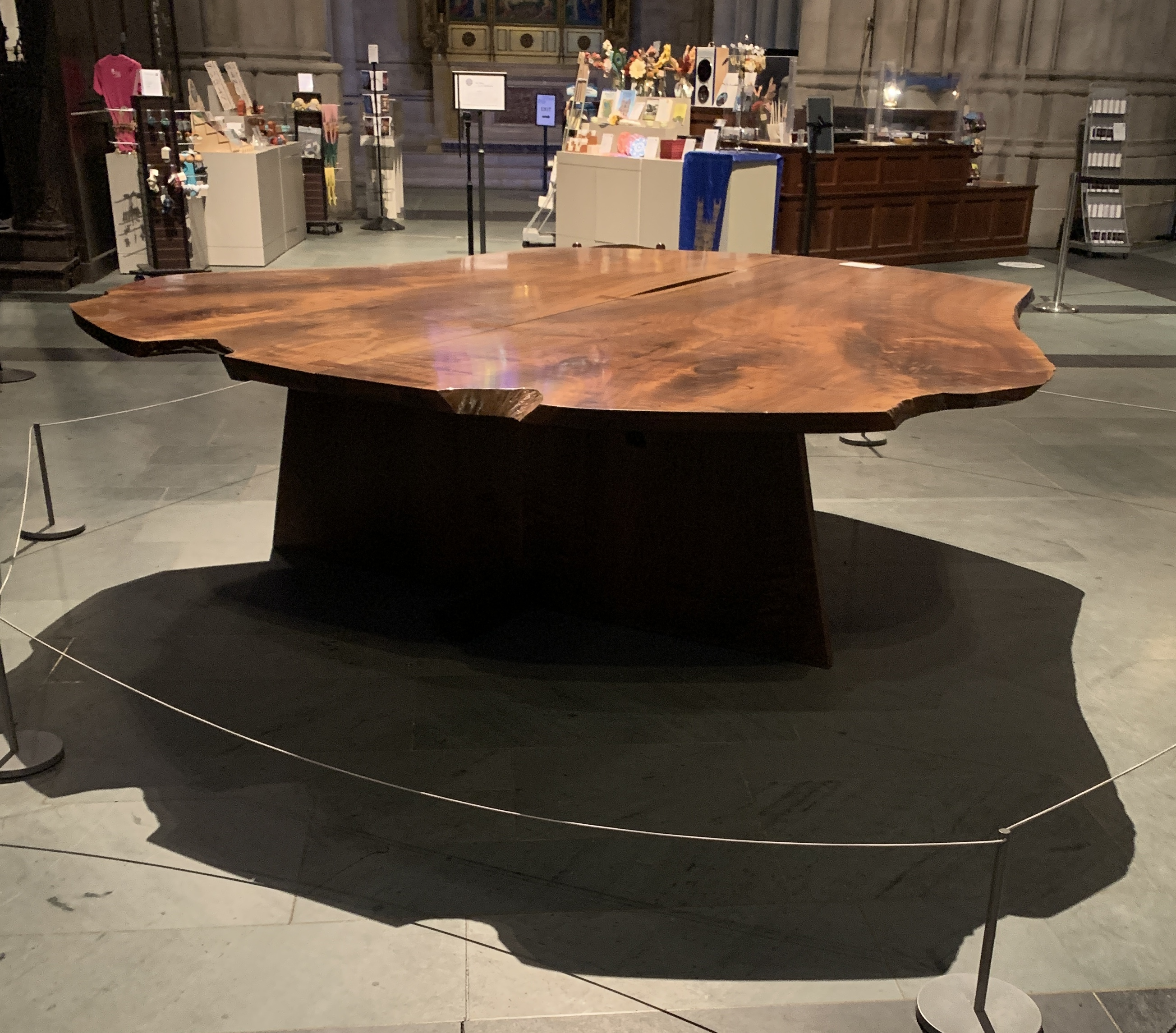
Altar for Peace in the Cathedral of St. John the Divine

Nakashima's home, studio, and workshop near and throughout New Hope, Pennsylvania, was listed on the U.S. National Register of Historic Places in August 2008; six years later the property was also designated a National Historic Landmark. In June 2015, the site received a "Keeping It Modern" grant from the Getty Foundation to create a solid conservation plan as a model approach for the preservation of historic properties. One of Nakashima's workshops, located in Takamatsu City, Japan, currently houses a museum and gallery of his works. The Nakashima Foundation for Peace, currently housed in the Minguren Museum in New Hope, had its beginnings in 1984. In 1984, George Nakashima had the opportunity to purchase the largest and finest walnut log he had ever seen and sought to use the immense planks to their fullest potential. He dreamed then that if Altars for Peace were made for each continent of the world, as centers for meditation, prayer, and activities for peace, the world would be a better place. Over the past decade, his furniture has become ultra-collectible and his legacy of what became known as the "free-edge" aesthetic influential. Today the Nakashima business makes standard wooden furniture and continues to create more peace altars, soon to complete Nakashima's legacy. To do so the company has procured yet another extremely valuable walnut log that almost matches the size and magnificence of the original.

Nakashima's daughter, Mira Nakashima, took over the company from her father after he died in 1990. Mira, who has worked for the family business since 1970, currently produces her father's iconic designs as well as her own.

== See also ==
- Widdicomb Furniture Company, for which Nakashima designed the "Origin Group" collection.
- National Institute of Design
- Gira Sarabhai
