= JASMS =

JASMS may refer to:

- Journal of the American Society for Mass Spectrometry, a scientific journal
- Jose Abad Santos Memorial School, the Basic Education Division (Nursery to High School) Department of the Philippine Women's University
  - Jose Abad Santos Memorial School Quezon City
