= SM Harrison Plaza =

- Location: Malate, Manila, Philippines
- Coordinates: 14°33′45.5″N 120°59′23″E
- Address: Adriatico Street cor. Ocampo Street
- Floor area: More than 200,000 m^{2} (2,200,000 sq ft)

The SM Harrison Plaza is a shopping mall under construction. It will be situated along Adriatico Street corner Ocampo Street in the district of Malate in Manila, Philippines where the old Harrison Plaza stood.

== History ==
=== Background ===
The original shopping mall named Harrison Plaza opened in 1976 and was widely regarded as the first modern and fully air-conditioned shopping mall in the Philippines, following the opening of Ali Mall in 1976. The old mall was owned by the Martel family.

In the late 2010s, SM Prime negotiated to acquire the property, intending to build a new shopping mall and a residential condominium complex on the site.

The old mall ceased operations on December 31, 2019, Following its closure, the structure sat dormant until it was fully demolished by October 2021 to clear the site.

=== Construction ===
Around 2024, the old Harrison Plaza is already in its post-demolition phase. In April 2026, SM Prime announced that it is investing ₱6 billion for the redevelopment project. The new SM Supermall, SM Harrison Plaza is scheduled to open in late 2027 or early 2028.

== Features ==
The SM Harrison Plaza is projected to have a gross floor area of more than 200,000 square meters (2,200,000 sq ft). With the upcoming shopping mall near various universities, SM Prime intends the first floor to be dedicated to a youth demographic. There are also plans to include an indoor arena within the development.
