= NCAA Season 89 =

- Host school: De La Salle-College of Saint Benilde
- Tagline: "Our Stars Will Shine in 89"

General
- Seniors: Benilde Blazers
- Juniors: San Beda Red Cubs

Seniors' champions
Sport		Men	Women
Basketball		San Beda	N/A
Volleyball		Perpetual	Perpetual
Chess		San Sebastian	
Taekwondo		San Beda	San Beda
Table Tennis		San Beda	San Beda
Lawn Tennis		Letran	
Soft Tennis		N/A	Benilde
Swimming		San Beda	San Beda
Beach Volleyball		Benilde	San Sebastian
Track and field		JRU	
Football		San Beda	
Badminton		Benilde	Benilde (DS)
- Cheerdance: Perpetual (Ex - Coed)

Juniors' champions
Sport		Boys	Girls
Basketball		San Beda	N/A
Volleyball		EAC	
Chess		Letran	
Taekwondo		San Sebastian	
Table Tennis		Letran	
Lawn Tennis		San Beda	
Swimming		LSGH	
Beach Volleyball		Arellano	
Track and field		EAC–ICA	
Football		San Beda	
Badminton		LSGH	
- (NT) = No tournament; (DS) = Demonstration Sport; (Ex) = Exhibition;

NCAA Season 89 is the 2013–14 season of the National Collegiate Athletic Association in the Philippines. The season, hosted by De La Salle-College of Saint Benilde opened on June 22, 2013 at the Mall of Asia Arena.

== Basketball ==
=== Seniors' tournament ===
==== Elimination round ====
Pos	Team	W	L	PCT	GB	Qualification
1	San Beda Red Lions	15	3	.833	—	Twice-to-beat in the semifinals
2	Letran Knights	14	4	.778	1	Twice-to-beat in the semifinals
3	San Sebastian Stags	11	7	.611 (Note: Third-seed playoff: San Sebastian 81–71 UPHSD)	4	Twice-to-win in the semifinals
4	Perpetual Altas	11	7	.611	4	Twice-to-win in the semifinals
5	EAC Generals (X)	10	8	.556	5	
6	Arellano Chiefs (X)	8	10	.444 (Note: Head-to-head record: Arellano 2–0 Lyceum)	7	
7	Lyceum Pirates (X)	8	10	.444	7	
8	JRU Heavy Bombers	6	12	.333	9	
9	Benilde Blazers (H)	5	13	.278	10	
10	Mapúa Cardinals	2	16	.111	13	

Source: ABS-CBN Sports
Rules for classification: 1) winning percentage; 2) if tied for top 4 seeds, one-game playoff; 3) head-to-head record; 4) overall point differential
(H) Hosts; (X) Under probation

==== Playoffs ====
Semifinals (Top 2 twice-to-beat)
1	San Beda	70
4	Perpetual	51
2	Letran	85
3	San Sebastian	58

Finals (Best-of-three playoff)
1	San Beda	80	74	60
2	Letran	68	79	56

=== Juniors' tournament ===
==== Elimination round ====
Pos	Team	W	L	PCT	GB	Qualification
1	San Beda Red Cubs	18	0	1.000	—	Thrice-to-beat in the Finals (Note: As San Beda won all of their elimination round games, the stepladder format will be used instead of the regular Final Four format.)
2	San Sebastian Staglets	15	3	.833	3	Proceed to stepladder round 2
3	La Salle Green Hills Greenies (H)	13	5	.722	5	Proceed to stepladder round 1
4	Mapúa Red Robins	12	6	.667	6	Proceed to stepladder round 1
5	JRU Light Bombers	11	7	.611	7	
6	Letran Squires	8	10	.444	10	
7	Perpetual Junior Altas	7	11	.389	11	
8	EAC–ICA Brigadiers (X)	3	15	.167 (Note: Head-to-head record: EAC 1–1 Arellano; EAC +4)	15	
9	Arellano Braves (X)	3	15	.167	15	
10	Lyceum Junior Pirates (X)	0	18	.000	18	

Source: ABS-CBN Sports
Rules for classification: 1) winning percentage; 2) if tied for top 4 seeds, one-game playoff; 3) head-to-head record; 4) overall point differential
(H) Hosts; (X) Under probation

==== Playoffs ====
Stepladder round 1 (Single-elimination)
3	LSGH	59*
4	Malayan	56

Stepladder round 2 (Single-elimination)
2	San Sebastian	72
3	LSGH	76

Finals (No. 1 thrice-to-beat)
1	San Beda	79	65
3	LSGH	68	59

*Overtime

== Volleyball ==
=== Men's tournament ===
==== Elimination round ====
===== Team standings =====
Pos	Team	Pld	W	L	Pts	SW	SL	SR	SPW	SPL	SPR	Qualification
1	Perpetual Altas	9	9	0	26	27	2	13.500	696	536	1.299	Semifinals
2	San Beda Red Lions	9	7	2	21	22	7	3.143	709	602	1.178	Semifinals
3	Benilde Blazers	9	7	2	21	22	8	2.750	715	601	1.190	Semifinals
4	EAC Generals	9	7	2	21	21	9	2.333	720	627	1.148	Semifinals
5	Arellano Chiefs	9	3	6	10	12	18	0.667	644	674	0.955	
6	Letran Knights	9	3	6	9	12	21	0.571	685	748	0.916	
7	San Sebastian Stags	9	3	6	9	12	21	0.571	675	740	0.912	
8	Mapúa Cardinals	9	3	6	9	10	21	0.476	647	730	0.886	
9	Lyceum Pirates	9	2	7	6	12	25	0.480	741	837	0.885	
10	JRU Heavy Bombers	9	1	8	3	8	26	0.308	663	800	0.829	

===== Match-up results =====
Team ╲ Game	1	2	3	4	5	6	7	8	9
AU	San Beda school colors	EAC school colors	JRU school colors	UPHD school colors	Letran school colors	Lyceum school colors	Mapua school colors	CSB school colors	SSC-R school colors
CSJL	SSC-R school colors	San Beda school colors	EAC school colors	JRU school colors	Arellano school colors	UPHD school colors	Lyceum school colors	Mapua school colors	CSB school colors
CSB	Lyceum school colors	Mapua school colors	UPHD school colors	SSC-R school colors	San Beda school colors	EAC school colors	JRU school colors	Arellano school colors	Letran school colors
EAC	JRU school colors	Arellano school colors	Letran school colors	Lyceum school colors	Mapua school colors	CSB school colors	SSC-R school colors	San Beda school colors	UPHD school colors
JRU	EAC school colors	UPHD school colors	Arellano school colors	Letran school colors	Lyceum school colors	Mapua school colors	CSB school colors	SSC-R school colors	San Beda school colors
LPU	CSB school colors	SSC-R school colors	San Beda school colors	EAC school colors	JRU school colors	Arellano school colors	Letran school colors	UPHD school colors	Mapua school colors
MIT	UPHD school colors	CSB school colors	SSC-R school colors	San Beda school colors	EAC school colors	JRU school colors	Arellano school colors	Letran school colors	Lyceum school colors
SBC	Arellano school colors	Letran school colors	Lyceum school colors	Mapua school colors	CSB school colors	SSC-R school colors	UPHD school colors	EAC school colors	JRU school colors
SSC–R	Letran school colors	Lyceum school colors	Mapua school colors	CSB school colors	UPHD school colors	San Beda school colors	EAC school colors	JRU school colors	Arellano school colors
UPHSD	Mapua school colors	JRU school colors	CSB school colors	Arellano school colors	SSC-R school colors	Letran school colors	San Beda school colors	Lyceum school colors	EAC school colors

= Win; = Loss

===== Results =====
Team	AU	CSJL	CSB	EAC	JRU	LPU	MIT	SBC	SSC-R	UPHSD
AU		3–0	1–3	0–3	3–0	2–3	3–0	0–3	0–3	0–3
CSJL	–		0–3	0–3	3–2	2–3	3–1	1–3	3–0	0–3
CSB	–	–		1–3	3–0	3–0	3–0	3–1	3–0	0–3
EAC	–	–	–		3–1	3–1	3–0	0–3	3–0	0–3
JRU	–	–	–	–		3–2	1–3	0–3	1–3	0–3
LPU	–	–	–	–	–		1–3	0–3	2–3	0–3
MIT	–	–	–	–	–	–		0–3	3–1	0–3
SBC	–	–	–	–	–	–	–		3–0	0–3
SSC-R	–	–	–	–	–	–	–	–		2–3
UPHSD	–	–	–	–	–	–	–	–	–	

Legend: Blue = left column team win; Red = top row team win.

==== Semifinals ====
===== Team standings =====
Pos	Team	Pld	W	L	Pts	SW	SL	SR	SPW	SPL	SPR	Qualification
1	Perpetual Altas	3	3	0	9	9	2	4.500	272	241	1.129	Finals
2	EAC Generals	3	2	1	6	6	4	1.500	229	218	1.050	Finals
3	San Beda Red Lions	3	1	2	2	5	8	0.625	280	303	0.924	
4	Benilde Blazers	3	0	3	1	3	9	0.333	259	278	0.932	

===== Match-up results =====
Team ╲ Game	1	2	3
CSB	San Beda school colors	UPHD school colors	EAC school colors
EAC	UPHD school colors	San Beda school colors	CSB school colors
SBC	CSB school colors	EAC school colors	UPHD school colors
UPHSD	EAC school colors	CSB school colors	San Beda school colors

= Win; = Loss

==== Finals ====
Date		Score		Set 1	Set 2	Set 3	Set 4	Set 5	Total
Jan 31	Perpetual Altas	3–0	EAC Generals	25–18	25–21	25–23	–	–	75–62
Feb 3	Perpetual Altas	3–2	EAC Generals	25–22	26–24	18–25	23-25	15–13	107–109
UPHSD wins series 2–0

==== Awards ====
- Most Valuable Player:
- Rookie of the Year:

=== Women's tournament ===
==== Elimination round ====
===== Team standings =====
Pos	Team	Pld	W	L	Pts	SW	SL	SR	SPW	SPL	SPR	Qualification
1	San Sebastian Lady Stags	9	7	2	22	25	10	2.500	808	673	1.201	Semifinals
2	Perpetual Lady Altas	9	7	2	21	24	10	2.400	783	640	1.223	Semifinals
3	Benilde Lady Blazers	9	7	2	20	24	11	2.182	781	684	1.142	Semifinals
4	Arellano Lady Chiefs	9	7	2	19	23	10	2.300	752	636	1.182	Semifinals
5	San Beda Red Lionesses	9	6	3	19	22	11	2.000	755	647	1.167	
6	EAC Lady Generals	9	5	4	16	18	14	1.286	717	614	1.168	
7	Lyceum Lady Pirates	9	3	6	9	11	20	0.550	650	722	0.900	
8	Letran Lady Knights	9	1	8	4	6	25	0.240	583	715	0.815	
9	Mapúa Lady Cardinals	9	1	8	3	5	25	0.200	492	746	0.660	
10	JRU Lady Bombers	9	1	8	2	4	26	0.154	493	717	0.688	

===== Match-up results =====
Team ╲ Game	1	2	3	4	5	6	7	8	9
AU	San Beda school colors	EAC school colors	JRU school colors	UPHD school colors	Letran school colors	Lyceum school colors	Mapua school colors	CSB school colors	SSC-R school colors
CSJL	SSC-R school colors	San Beda school colors	EAC school colors	JRU school colors	Arellano school colors	UPHD school colors	Lyceum school colors	Mapua school colors	CSB school colors
CSB	Lyceum school colors	Mapua school colors	UPHD school colors	SSC-R school colors	San Beda school colors	EAC school colors	JRU school colors	Arellano school colors	Letran school colors
EAC	JRU school colors	Arellano school colors	Letran school colors	Lyceum school colors	Mapua school colors	CSB school colors	SSC-R school colors	San Beda school colors	UPHD school colors
JRU	EAC school colors	UPHD school colors	Arellano school colors	Letran school colors	Lyceum school colors	Mapua school colors	CSB school colors	SSC-R school colors	San Beda school colors
LPU	CSB school colors	SSC-R school colors	San Beda school colors	EAC school colors	JRU school colors	Arellano school colors	Letran school colors	UPHD school colors	Mapua school colors
MIT	UPHD school colors	CSB school colors	SSC-R school colors	San Beda school colors	EAC school colors	JRU school colors	Arellano school colors	Letran school colors	Lyceum school colors
SBC	Arellano school colors	Letran school colors	Lyceum school colors	Mapua school colors	CSB school colors	SSC-R school colors	UPHD school colors	EAC school colors	JRU school colors
SSC–R	Letran school colors	Lyceum school colors	Mapua school colors	CSB school colors	UPHD school colors	San Beda school colors	EAC school colors	JRU school colors	Arellano school colors
UPHSD	Mapua school colors	JRU school colors	CSB school colors	Arellano school colors	SSC-R school colors	Letran school colors	San Beda school colors	Lyceum school colors	EAC school colors

= Win; = Loss

===== Results =====
Team	AU	CSJL	CSB	EAC	JRU	LPU	MIT	SBC	SSC-R	UPHSD
AU		3–0	3–2	3–0	3–0	3–0	3–0	1–3	1–3	3–2
CSJL	–		0–3	0–3	2–3	1–3	3–1	0–3	0–3	0–3
CSB	–	–		3–2	3–0	3–0	3–0	1–3	3–2	3–1
EAC	–	–	–		3–0	3–1	3–0	3–1	0–3	1–3
JRU	–	–	–	–		0–3	1–3	0–3	0–3	0–3
LPU	–	–	–	–	–		3–1	0–3	1–3	0–3
MIT	–	–	–	–	–	–		0–3	0–3	0–3
SBC	–	–	–	–	–	–	–		2–3	1–3
SSC-R	–	–	–	–	–	–	–	–		2–3
UPHSD	–	–	–	–	–	–	–	–	–	

Legend: Blue = left column team win; Red = top row team win.

==== Semifinals ====
===== Team standings =====
Pos	Team	Pld	W	L	Pts	SW	SL	SR	SPW	SPL	SPR	Qualification
1	Arellano Lady Chiefs	3	2	1	7	8	4	2.000	272	238	1.143	Finals
2	Perpetual Lady Altas	3	2	1	5	7	5	1.400	275	263	1.046	Finals
3	Benilde Lady Blazers	3	2	1	5	6	6	1.000	248	271	0.915	
4	San Sebastian Lady Stags	3	0	3	1	3	9	0.333	240	263	0.913	

===== Match-up results =====
Team ╲ Game	1	2	3
AU	SSC-R school colors	UPHD school colors	CSB school colors
CSB	UPHD school colors	SSC-R school colors	Arellano school colors
SSC–R	Arellano school colors	CSB school colors	UPHD school colors
UPHSD	CSB school colors	Arellano school colors	SSC-R school colors

= Win; = Loss

==== Finals ====
Date		Score		Set 1	Set 2	Set 3	Set 4	Set 5	Total
Jan 31	Arellano Lady Chiefs	2–3	Perpetual Lady Altas	29–27	13–25	16–25	25–21	13–15	96–113
Feb 3	Arellano Lady Chiefs	3–0	Perpetual Lady Altas	25–21	25–22	25–16	-	–	75–59
Feb 6	Arellano Lady Chiefs	2–3	Perpetual Lady Altas	25–17	22–25	16–25	27–25	13–15	106–107
UPHSD wins series 2–1

==== Awards ====
- Most Valuable Player: Honey Royse Tubino
- Rookie of the Year:

=== Juniors' tournament ===
==== Elimination round ====
===== Team standings =====
Pos	Team	Pld	W	L	Pts	SW	SL	SR	SPW	SPL	SPR	Qualification
1	EAC–ICA Brigadiers	7	6	1	19	20	5	4.000	595	456	1.305	Semifinals
2	Perpetual Junior Altas	7	7	0	18	21	7	3.000	645	505	1.277	Semifinals
3	San Sebastian Staglets	7	5	2	16	18	8	2.250	598	524	1.141	Semifinals
4	Arellano Braves	7	4	3	13	15	10	1.500	573	535	1.071	Semifinals
5	Lyceum Junior Pirates	7	3	4	9	10	12	0.833	483	488	0.990	
6	Letran Squires	7	2	5	6	7	15	0.467	433	504	0.859	
7	San Beda Red Cubs	7	1	6	3	5	18	0.278	470	523	0.899	
8	La Salle Green Hills Greenies	7	0	7	0	0	21	0.000	266	528	0.504	

===== Match-up results =====
Team ╲ Game	1	2	3	4	5	6	7
AU	San Beda school colors	EAC school colors	UPHD school colors	Letran school colors	Lyceum school colors	CSB school colors	SSC-R school colors
CSJL	SSC-R school colors	San Beda school colors	EAC school colors	Arellano school colors	UPHD school colors	Lyceum school colors	CSB school colors
LSGH	Lyceum school colors	UPHD school colors	SSC-R school colors	San Beda school colors	EAC school colors	Arellano school colors	Letran school colors
EAC–ICA	Arellano school colors	Letran school colors	Lyceum school colors	CSB school colors	SSC-R school colors	San Beda school colors	UPHD school colors
LPU	CSB school colors	SSC-R school colors	San Beda school colors	EAC school colors	Arellano school colors	Letran school colors	UPHD school colors
SBC	Arellano school colors	Letran school colors	Lyceum school colors	CSB school colors	SSC-R school colors	UPHD school colors	EAC school colors
SSC–R	Letran school colors	Lyceum school colors	CSB school colors	UPHD school colors	San Beda school colors	EAC school colors	Arellano school colors
UPHSD	CSB school colors	Arellano school colors	SSC-R school colors	Letran school colors	San Beda school colors	Lyceum school colors	EAC school colors

= Win; = Loss

===== Results =====
Team	AU	CSJL	CSB	EAC	LPU	SBC-R	SSC-R	UPHSD
AU		3–1	3–0	1–3	3–0	3–0	0–3	2–3
CSJL	–		3–0	0–3	0–3	0–3	0–3	0–3
CSB	–	–		0–3	0–3	0–3	0–3	0–3
EAC	–	–	–		3–0	3–0	3–1	2–3
LPU	–	–	–	–		3–0	1–3	2–3
SBC-R	–	–	–	–	–		1–3	1–3
SSC-R	–	–	–	–	–	–		2–3
UPHSD	–	–	–	–	–	–	–	

Legend: Blue = left column team win; Red = top row team win.

==== Awards ====
- Most Valuable Player: Baser Amer (SBC)
- Sped of the Year: Jeff Salcedo (Pakara University)

== Football ==
=== Men's tournament ===
==== Elimination round ====
===== Team standings =====
Pos	Team	Pld	W	D	L	GF	GA	GD	Pts
1	San Beda Red Lions	1	1	0	0	5	0	+5	3
2	Arellano Chiefs	0	0	0	0	0	0	0	0
3	Benilde Blazers	0	0	0	0	0	0	0	0
4	EAC Generals	0	0	0	0	0	0	0	0
5	Lyceum Pirates	0	0	0	0	0	0	0	0
6	Perpetual Altas	0	0	0	0	0	0	0	0
7	Mapúa Cardinals (H)	1	0	0	1	0	5	−5	0

(H) Hosts

===== Match-up results =====
Team ╲ Game	1	2	3	4	5	6
AU	UPHD school colors	Lyceum school colors	Mapua school colors	CSB school colors	EAC school colors	San Beda school colors
CSB	Lyceum school colors	Mapua school colors	San Beda school colors	EAC school colors	Arellano school colors	UPHD school colors
EAC	Lyceum school colors	Mapua school colors	CSB school colors	San Beda school colors	Arellano school colors	UPHD school colors
LPU	CSB school colors	EAC school colors	Arellano school colors	UPHD school colors	San Beda school colors	Mapua school colors
MIT	San Beda school colors	CSB school colors	EAC school colors	Arellano school colors	UPHD school colors	Lyceum school colors
SBC	Mapua school colors	UPHD school colors	CSB school colors	EAC school colors	Lyceum school colors	Arellano school colors
UPHSD	Arellano school colors	San Beda school colors	Lyceum school colors	Mapua school colors	CSB school colors	EAC school colors

= Win; = Draw; = Loss

==== Awards ====
- Most Valuable Player:
- Best Defender:
- Best Midfielder:
- Best Striker:

Rookie of the Year:

=== Juniors' tournament ===
==== Elimination round ====
===== Team standings =====
Pos	Team	Pld	W	D	L	GF	GA	GD	Pts
1	Arellano Braves	0	0	0	0	0	0	0	0
2	Letran Squires	0	0	0	0	0	0	0	0
3	La Salle Green Hills Greenies	0	0	0	0	0	0	0	0
4	EAC–ICA Brigadiers	0	0	0	0	0	0	0	0
5	Lyceum Junior Pirates	0	0	0	0	0	0	0	0
6	San Beda Red Cubs	0	0	0	0	0	0	0	0
7	Perpetual Junior Altas	0	0	0	0	0	0	0	0

===== Match-up results =====
Team ╲ Game	1	2	3	4	5
AU	EAC school colors	Lyceum school colors	San Beda school colors	CSB school colors	UPHD school colors
CSB	UPHD school colors	EAC school colors	Lyceum school colors	Arellano school colors	San Beda school colors
EAC	Arellano school colors	CSB school colors	UPHD school colors	San Beda school colors	Lyceum school colors
LPU	San Beda school colors	Arellano school colors	CSB school colors	UPHD school colors	EAC school colors
SBC–R	Lyceum school colors	UPHD school colors	Arellano school colors	EAC school colors	CSB school colors
UPHSD	CSB school colors	San Beda school colors	EAC school colors	Lyceum school colors	Arellano school colors

= Win; = Draw; = Loss

==== Awards ====
- Most Valuable Player: Daniel C. Abraham
- Best Defender: Daniel C. Abraham
- Best Midfielder: Jerome Marzan
- Best Striker: Ramon Barsales
- Rookie of the Year:

== Swimming ==
The swimming events of Season 89 were held on August 27, 28, and 29, 2013.

=== Men's tournament ===
#	Team	Total
1st place, gold medalist(s)	San Beda Red Lions	1,230.25
2nd place, silver medalist(s)	**Benilde Blazers**	689.75
3rd place, bronze medalist(s)	EAC Generals	374.50
4	Letran Knights	204.00
5	San Sebastian Stags	191.25
6	Arellano Chiefs	152.50
7	Lyceum Pirates	45.25
8	Mapúa Cardinals	30.50
9	Perpetual Altas	13.50
10	JRU Heavy Bombers	1.00

Season host is boldfaced.

Most Valuable Player: Joshua Junsay
Rookie of the year: Raphy Leonardo Ortanez

=== Women's tournament ===
#	Team	Total
1st place, gold medalist(s)	San Beda Red Lionesses	1,001.50
2nd place, silver medalist(s)	**Benilde Lady Blazers**	837.75
3rd place, bronze medalist(s)	EAC Lady Generals	457.50
4	San Sebastian Lady Stags	231.75
5	Lyceum Lady Pirates	125.50
6	Mapúa Lady Cardinals Arellano Lady Chiefs	60.00
7		48.50
8	Letran Lady Knights	39.50
9	Perpetual Lady Altas	-
10	JRU Lady Bombers	-

Season host is boldfaced.

Most Valuable Player: Maria Aresa Lipat
Rookie of the year: Febbie Mae Porras

=== Juniors' tournament ===
#	Team	Total
1st place, gold medalist(s)	**La Salle Green Hills Greenies**	978.00
2nd place, silver medalist(s)	San Beda Red Cubs	967.00
3rd place, bronze medalist(s)	San Sebastian Staglets	316.50
4	Lyceum Junior Pirates	214.25
5	Letran Squires	182.00
6	Mapúa Red Robins	84.25
7	Arellano Braves	73.25
8	Perpetual Junior Altas	72.75
9	EAC–ICA Brigadiers	37.50
10	JRU Light Bombers	1.00

Season host is boldfaced.

Most Valuable Player: Miguel Karlo Barlisan
Rookie of the year: John Soriano

== Table Tennis ==
Tournament format:

- All rubbers:
  - Each rubber is best of three matches.
  - Each match is best of five sets.
  - Each set is race to eleven points, with deuce if tied on ten points.
  - Order of matches is two singles, a doubles and two singles. If 3 matches have been won, the remaining matches are no longer played.
- First round: Single round robin; team with the best record advances to the Finals and second round; next three teams advance to the second round.
- Second round: Single round robin; team with the best record advances to the Finals. If a team wins both rounds, the Finals is no longer played and that team is declared as the champions.
- Finals: One rubber, best of 3 matches.

=== Men's tournament ===
==== First round ====
#	Team	W	L	Pts.
1	Letran Knights	8	1	17
2	San Beda Red Lions	8	1	17
3	**Benilde Blazers**	7	2	16
4	EAC Generals	6	3	15
5	Arellano Chiefs	5	4	14
6	San Sebastian Stags	4	5	13
7	Mapúa Cardinals	3	6	12
8	Perpetual Altas	2	7	11
9	Lyceum Pirates	1	8	10
10	JRU Heavy Bombers	0	9	9

Season host is boldfaced.

Qualified to the second round and finals
Qualified to the second round

==== Second round ====
#	Team	W	L	Pts.
1	San Beda Red Lions	3	0	**6**
2	Letran Knights	2	1	**5**
3	Benilde Blazers	1	2	**4**
4	EAC Generals	0	3	**3**

Qualified to the finals

==== Finals ====
September 7, 2013; 3:00 p.m.	Letran Knights	0–**3**	**San Beda Red Lions**	Harrison Plaza Activity Center, Manila

	**Individual matches**
Letran	3–1	San Beda	7–11, 11–4, 10–12, 8–11
Letran	0–3	San Beda	5–11, 4–11, 6–11
Letran	0–3	San Beda	6–11, 7–11, 5–11

=== Women's tournament ===
==== First round ====
#	Team	W	L	Pts.
1	San Beda Red Lionesses	8	0	16
2	**Benilde Lady Blazers**	7	1	15
3	Arellano Lady Chiefs	6	2	14
4	Letran Lady Knights	5	3	13
5	EAC Lady Generals	4	4	12
6	Lyceum Lady Pirates	3	5	11
7	San Sebastian Lady Stags	2	6	10
8	Mapúa Lady Cardinals	1	7	9
9	JRU Lady Bombers	0	8	8

Season host is boldfaced.

Qualified to the second round and finals
Qualified to the second round

==== Second round ====
#	Team	W	L	Pts.
1	Benilde Lady Blazers	3	0	**6**
2	San Beda Red Lionesses	2	1	**5**
3	Arellano Lady Chiefs	1	2	**4**
4	Letran Lady Knights	0	3	**3**

Qualified to the finals

==== Finals ====
September 7, 2013; 3:00 p.m.	Benilde Lady Blazers	2–**3**	**San Beda Red Lionesses**	Harrison Plaza Activity Center, Manila

	**Individual matches**
Benilde	3–2	San Beda	10–12, 7–11, 11–3, 11–5, 11–8
Benilde	2–3	San Beda	4–11, 8–11, 15–13, 13–11, 10–12
Benilde	2–3	San Beda	11–3, 8–11, 6–11, 11–7, 10–12
Benilde	3–0	San Beda	11–3, 11–5, 12–10
Benilde	0–3	San Beda	6–11, 5–11, 7–11

=== Juniors' tournament ===
==== First round ====
#	Team	W	L	Pts.
1	San Beda Red Cubs	9	0	18
2	Arellano Braves	8	1	17
3	Letran Squires	7	2	16
4	Lyceum Junior Pirates	6	3	15
5	EAC–ICA Brigadiers	5	4	14
6	San Sebastian Staglets	4	5	13
7	Perpetual Junior Altas	3	6	12
8	**La Salle Green Hills Greenies**	2	7	11
9	JRU Light Bombers	1	8	10
10	Mapúa Red Robins	0	9	9

Season host is boldfaced.

Qualified to the second round and finals
Qualified to the second round

==== Second round ====
#	Team	W	L	Pts.
1	Letran Squires	3	0	**6**
2	San Beda Red Cubs	2	1	**5**
3	Arellano Braves	1	2	**4**
4	Lyceum Pirates	0	3	**3**

Qualified to the finals

==== Finals ====
September 7, 2013; 3:00 p.m.	San Beda Red Cubs	1–**3**	**Letran Squires**	Harrison Plaza Activity Center, Manila

	**Individual matches**
San Beda	3–1	Letran	11–9, 11–4, 6–11, 11–7
San Beda	2–3	Letran	4–11, 8–11, 15–13, 13–11, 10–12
San Beda	0–3	Letran	2–11, 8–11, 7–11
San Beda	0–3	Letran	4–11, 14–16, 5–11
San Beda	2–3	Letran	12–10, 11–9, 9–11, 9–11, 7–11

== Badminton ==
=== Men's tournament ===
Pld	Team	W	D	L
1st place, gold medalist(s)	Benilde Blazers	3	0	0
2nd place, silver medalist(s)	Letran Knights	2	0	1
3rd place, bronze medalist(s)	Arellano Chiefs	1	0	2
4	Mapúa Cardinals	0	0	3

=== Juniors' tournament ===
Pld	Team	W	D	L
1st place, gold medalist(s)	La Salle Green Hills Greenies	3	0	0
2nd place, silver medalist(s)	Lyceum Junior Pirates	2	0	1
3rd place, bronze medalist(s)	San Beda Red Cubs	1	0	2
4	EAC–ICA Brigadiers	0	0	3

=== Women's tournament ===
Pld	Team	W	D	L
1st place, gold medalist(s)	Benilde Lady Blazers	3	0	0
2nd place, silver medalist(s)	Letran Lady Knights	2	0	1
3rd place, bronze medalist(s)	San Beda Red Lionesses	1	0	2
4	Mapúa Lady Cardinals	0	0	3

== Taekwondo ==
The tournament was held on October 19–20, 2013 and will be held at JRU Gymnasium in Mandaluyong.

=== Men's tournament ===
Team	Medals				Points
Team	1st place, gold medalist(s)	2nd place, silver medalist(s)	3rd place, bronze medalist(s)	Total	Points
San Beda					391
San Sebastian					225
Benilde					199.3

=== Women's tournament ===
Team	Medals				Points
Team	1st place, gold medalist(s)	2nd place, silver medalist(s)	3rd place, bronze medalist(s)	Total	Points
San Beda					323.37
Benilde					229
San Sebastian					239.24

=== Juniors' tournament ===
Team	Medals				Points
Team	1st place, gold medalist(s)	2nd place, silver medalist(s)	3rd place, bronze medalist(s)	Total	Points
San Sebastian					246
Arellano					216
Benilde					162

== Cheerleading ==
The NCAA Cheerleading Competition will be held on March 6, 2014 at SM Mall of Asia Arena

Rank	Team	Order	Tumbling	Stunts	Tosses	Pyramids	Dance	Points
1st	Altas Perpsquad	10	-	-	-	-	-	480.5 pts.
2nd	AU Dancing Chiefs	9	-	-	-	-	-	468 pts.
3rd	Mapua Cheerping Cardinals	5	-	-	-	-	-	450.5 pts.
4th	LPU Pep Squad	6	-	-	-	-	-	440.5 pts.
5th	JRU Cheer Explosives	3	-	-	-	-	-	426 pts.
6th	EAC Pep Squad	8	-	-	-	-	-	420.5 pts.
7th	CSB Animo Squad	4	-	-	-	-	-	415.5 pts.
8th	Lakas Arriba Cheerleading Team	7	-	-	-	-	-	384.5 pts.
9th	San Beda Red Corps	2	-	-	-	-	-	329.5 pts.
10th	Golden Stags Cheerleading Squad	1	-	-	-	-	-	278 pts.

Defending champion in boldface
"Order" refers to order of performance.

=== Group Stunts Division ===
Champion	2nd place	3rd place
TBA	TBA	TBA

=== Awards ===
NCAA Season 89 cheerleading champions

== Championship Summary ==
The current point system gives 50 points to the champion team in a certain NCAA event, 40 to the runner-up, and 35 to the third placer. The following points are given in consequent order of finish: 30, 25, 20, 15, 10, 8 and 6. For every non-participation of a member school, 5 points will be deducted to the point system.

Pts.	Position
50	Champion
40	2nd
35	3rd
30	4th
25	5th
20	6th
10	7th
8	8th
6	9th
4	10th
0	Did not join
WD	Withdrew

=== Medal table ===
Rank	Team	Gold	Silver	Bronze	Total
1	San Beda Red Lions	8	1	1	8
2	Benilde Blazers	3	5	4	12
3	San Sebastian Stags	2	3	2	7
4	Perpetual Altas	2	1	2	5
5	Letran Knights	1	3	1	5
6	JRU Heavy Bombers	1	0	0	1
7	Arellano Chiefs	0	3	2	5
8	EAC Generals	0	2	3	5
9	Lyceum Pirates	0	0	0	0
10	Mapúa Cardinals	0	0	0	0

=== Medal table ===
Rank	Team	Gold	Silver	Bronze	Total
1	La Salle Green Hills Greenies	2	0	1	3
2	San Sebastian Staglets	2	0	1	3
4	Letran Squires	2	0	0	2
3	San Beda Red Cubs	0	2	1	3
5	Lyceum Junior Pirates	0	1	1	2
6	Arellano Braves	0	1	1	2
7	EAC–ICA Brigadiers	0	0	0	0
8	JRU Light Bombers	0	0	0	0
9	Mapúa Red Robins	0	0	0	0
10	Perpetual Junior Altas	0	0	0	0
Total		0	0	0	0

=== Seniors' Division ===
Rank	School	Basketball	Chess	Badminton	Men's Swimming	Women's Swimming	Men's table tennis	Women's table tennis	Men's Taekwondo	Women's Taekwondo	Men's Volleyball	Women's volleyball	Lawn tennis	Soft tennis	Football	Men's beach volleyball	Women's beach volleyball	Track and field	Pts.
1	Benilde	8	40	40	40	35	35	35	30	35	30	35	35	40	15	50	17.5	30	550.5
2	San Beda	50	10	8	50	45	50	45	45	45	35	25	25	30	35	6	25	15	544
3	San Sebastian	35	50	0	25	25	20	10	35	30	15	30	40	15	0	8	50	40	428
4	Arellano	17.5	25	25	20	10	25	30	25	20	25	40	30	6	25	25	35	25	413.5
5	Letran	40	20	30	30	8	40	25	15	10	20	10	50	8	0	35	10	20	371
6	EAC	25	35	10	35	30	30	20	10	15	40	20	6	10	10	30	35	6	367
7	Perpetual	30	8	8	8	6	10	0	8	6	50	50	20	25	6	40	30	35	340
8	Lyceum	17.5	30	15	15	20	8	15	20	25	8	15	15	20	20	10	17.5	8	279
9	Mapúa	6	15	20	10	15	15	8	6	8	10	8	10	0	8	15	5	10	170
10	JRU	10	6	0	6	0	6	6	0	0	6	6	8	0	0	20	8	50	132

== See also ==
- UAAP Season 76
