= Jose Abad Santos (disambiguation) =

Jose Abad Santos may refer to:

- José Abad Santos, a Chief Justice of the Supreme Court of the Philippines and national hero, source of the other names on this page
- Jose Abad Santos, Davao Occidental, a municipality in the Philippines
- Jose Abad Santos Memorial School, Manila campus of the primary and secondary education division of the Philippine Women's University
  - Jose Abad Santos Memorial School Quezon City campus
- Jose Abad Santos Avenue, a highway spanning four provinces in Central Luzon, Philippines
- Abad Santos Avenue, a major thoroughfare in Manila, Philippines
- Abad Santos station, a station of Manila LRT
- Arellano University - Jose Abad Santos Campus, located in Pasay, Philippines
