= Malate, Manila =

District of Manila, Metro Manila, Philippines

Malate
- District of Manila
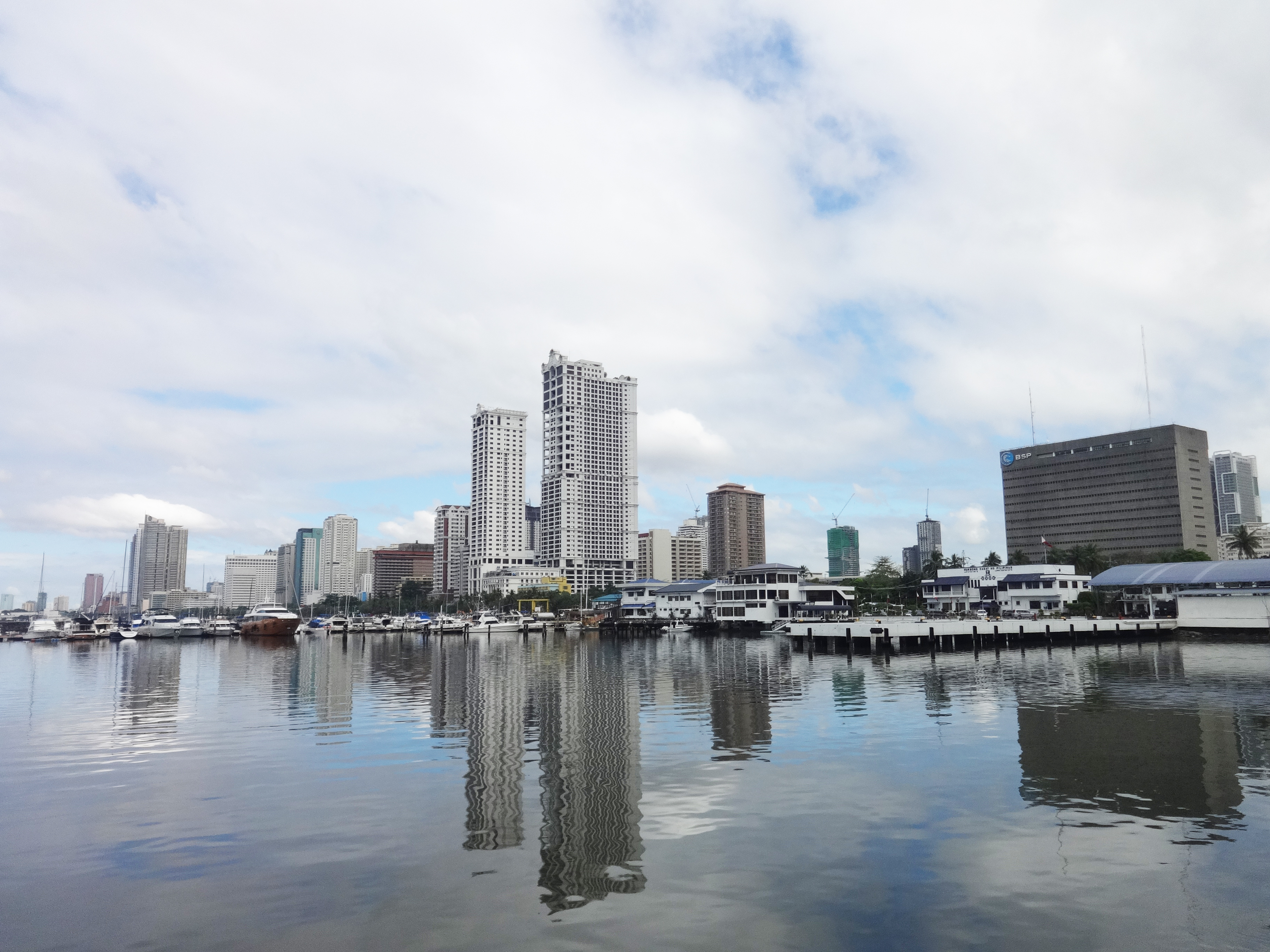
- Malate skyline

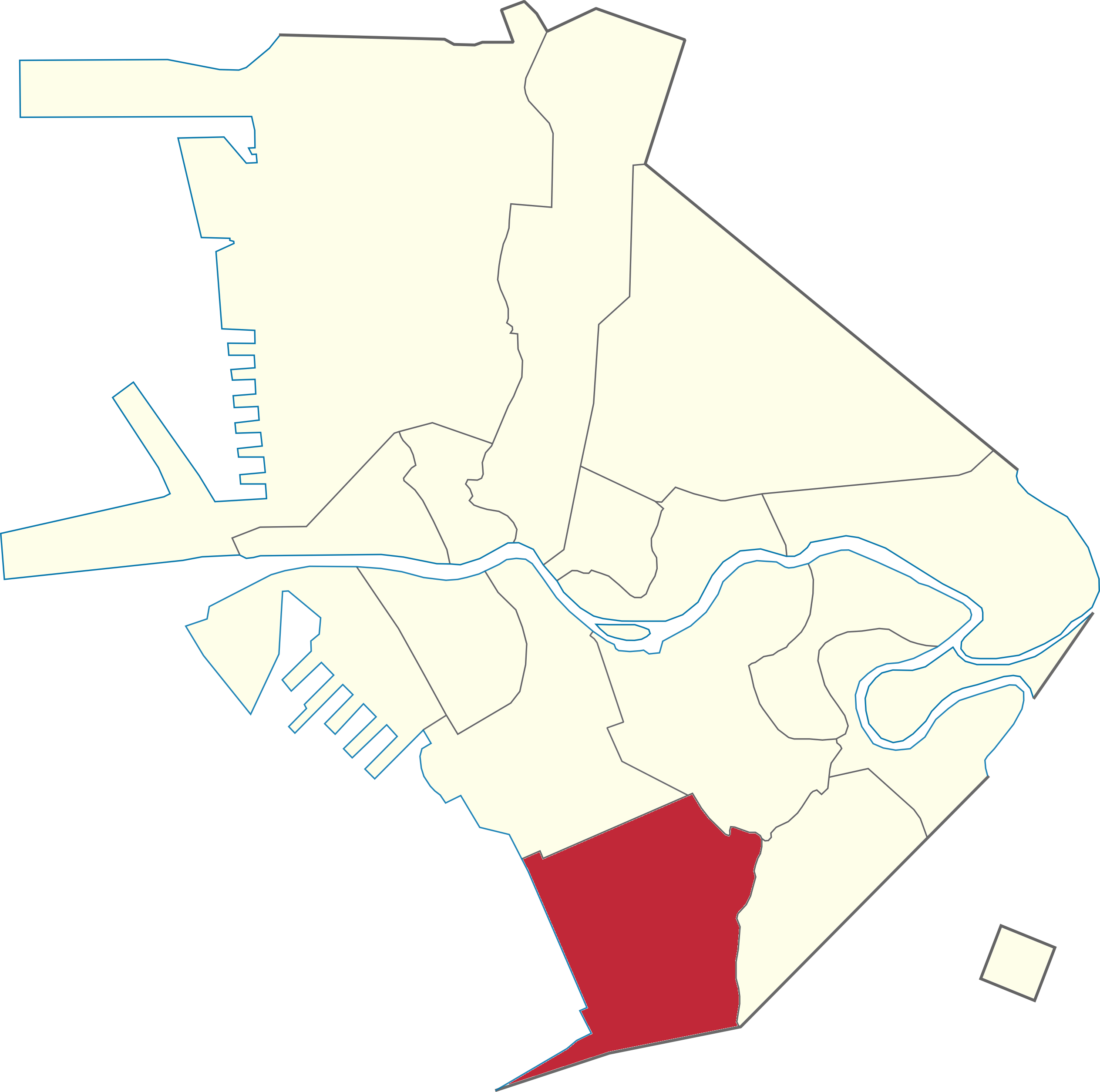
- Interactive map of Malate
- Coordinates: 14.5641654°N 120.9913229°E
- Country: Philippines
- Region: National Capital Region
- City: Manila
- Congressional districts: Part of the 5th district of Manila
- Barangays: 57

Area
  - Total: 2.5958 km^{2} (1.0022 sq mi)

Population (2024)
  - Total: 114,751
  - Density: 21.384/km^{2} (55.38/sq mi)
- Time zone: UTC+08:00 (Philippine Standard Time)
- Zip codes: 1004
- Area codes: 2

Malate is a district of Manila, Philippines. Together with the district of Ermita, it serves as Manila's center for commerce and tourism.

== Etymology ==
The name Malate is derived from a corruption of the Tagalog word maalat ("salty"). The name likely referred to the brackish waters, where the river estuary (today’s Malate Estero) meets Manila Bay.

Antonio de Morga, writing in his 1609 Sucesos de las Islas Filipinas: "Manila has two drives for recreation. One is by land, along the point called Nuestra Señora de Guia. It extends for about a legua along the shore and is very clean and level. Thence it passes through a native street and settlement, called Bagunbayan, to a chapel, much frequented by the devout, called Nuestra Señora de Guia, and continues for a goodly distance further to a monastery and mission-house of the Augustinians, called Mahalat."

José Rizal, who republished Morga's account and later annotated it: "Better, Maalat. The Spaniards pronounced this later as "Malate". There lived the chief Tagáls after they were deprived of their houses in Manila, among whom were the families of Raja Matanda and Raja Soliman. San Augustín says that even in his day many of the ancient nobility dwelt there, and that they were very urbane and cultured. 'The Men hold various positions in Manila, and certain occupations in some of the local public functions. The women make excellent lace, in which they are so skilful that the Dutch women cannot surpass them.' This is still true of the women."

== History ==
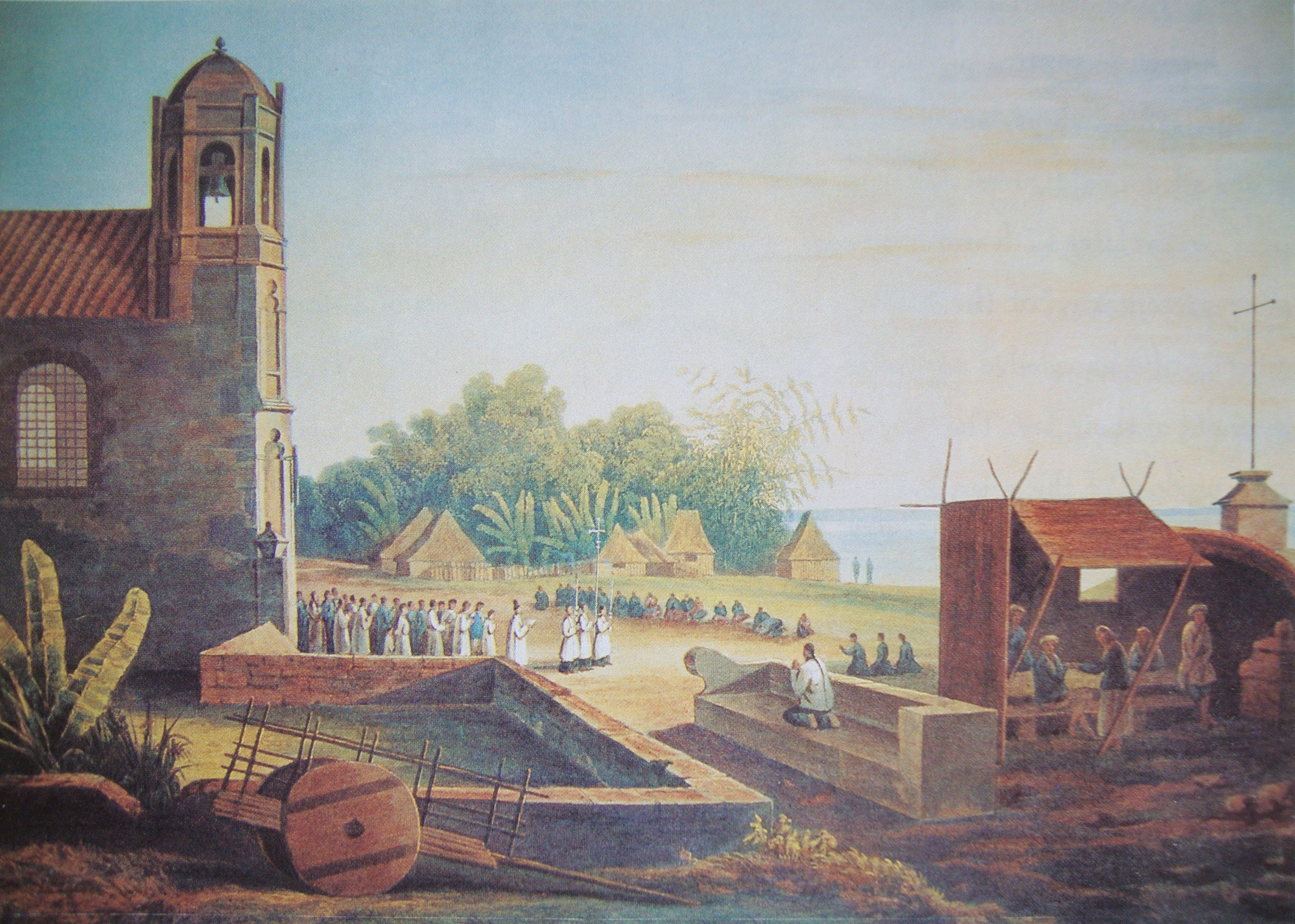
View of Malate Church and the coast, c. 1831

Malate was thought of as the place where the kings or high chiefs of Manila settled after losing their fort of Maynila (now Intramuros) to the Spanish under Miguel López de Legazpi in 1571. During most of the Spanish colonial period, Malate was an open space with a small fishing village. During the Spanish period, the center of activity was Malate Church, built on the mixture of Mexican Baroque and Filipino Muslim Mudejar styles, dedicated to Our Lady of Remedies. It was bordered by Pasay to the south, San Andrés Bukid to the east, Manila Bay to the west, Paco to the northeast, Makati to the southeast, and Ermita to the north.

After the United States of America annexed the islands in 1898 as a consequence of the Spanish–American War, American urban planners envisioned the development of Malate as the newest and trendiest exclusive residential area for American families. American expatriates and some of the old Spanish mestizo families populated the district in modern high-rise apartments and bungalows. In 1901, with the chartering of the City of Manila, Malate would be absorbed by the city when its borders were extended beyond Intramuros.

Despite extensive damage in the Second World War, many homes and buildings in the district remained still standing. The displaced wealthy families who evacuated their homes during the war returned and re-built their private villas and kept the whole district exclusively residential until the 1970s.

The once exclusive residential areas in western Malate began to transform into a commercial area with some large homes and residential apartments being converted into small hotels, specialty restaurants and cafes.

During the authoritarian regime of President Ferdinand Marcos, Sr, visual and performing artists found a haven in Malate and it became a bohemian enclave.

The Malate district was the setting for the episode "Mata" of the 2010 horror film Cinco. In 2011, it feature in the horror film, Bulong.

== List of barangays ==
Zones	Barangays
Zone 75	Barangays 688, 689, 690, 691, 692, 693, 694, and 695
Zone 76	Barangays 696, 697, 698, and 699
Zone 77	Barangays 700, 701, 702, 703, 704, 705, and 706
Zone 78	Barangays 707, 708, 709, 710, 711, 712, 713, 714, 715, 716, 717, 718, 719, 720, and 721
Zone 79	Barangays 722, 723, 724, 725, 726, 727, 728, 729, and 730
Zone 80	Barangays 731, 732, 733, 734, 735, 736, 737, 738, 739, 740, 741, 742, 743, and 744

Barangay	Land area (km²)	Population (2020 census)
Zone 75
Barangay 688	0.04690 km²	1,212
Barangay 689	0.02462 km²	733
Barangay 690	0.01288 km²	496
Barangay 691	0.01467 km²	409
Barangay 692	0.03993 km²	1,329
Barangay 693	0.02784 km²	511
Barangay 694	0.07146 km²	1,281
Barangay 695	0.04763 km²	654
Zone 76
Barangay 696	0.08344 km²	2,420
Barangay 697	0.08563 km²	1,967
Barangay 698	0.08458 km²	1,736
Barangay 699	0.1955 km²	3,193
Zone 77
Barangay 700	0.03950 km²	138
Barangay 701	0.1914 km²	2,695
Barangay 702	0.04345 km²	3,342
Barangay 703	0.05857 km²	114
Barangay 704	0.03584 km²	5,299
Barangay 705	0.02287 km²	2,683
Barangay 706	0.04013 km²	296
Zone 78
Barangay 707	0.004390 km²	1,052
Barangay 708	0.02016 km²	753
Barangay 709	0.04385 km²	4,154
Barangay 710	0.01038 km²	559
Barangay 711	0.008760 km²	1,294
Barangay 712	0.01313 km²	1,068
Barangay 713	0.005250 km²	1,964
Barangay 714	0.01546 km²	1,371
Barangay 715	0.005370 km²	180
Barangay 716	0.004890 km²	920
Barangay 717	0.002740 km²	479
Barangay 718	0.008380 km²	1,155
Barangay 719	0.4977 km²	6,690
Barangay 720	0.05317 km²	1,238
Barangay 721	0.1336 km²	577
Zone 79
Barangay 722	0.02605 km²	641
Barangay 723	0.02234 km²	540
Barangay 724	0.08319 km²	2,388
Barangay 725	0.05289 km²	1,409
Barangay 726	0.04322 km²	595
Barangay 727	0.05788 km²	1,790
Barangay 728	0.07134 km²	840
Barangay 729	0.03145 km²	871
Barangay 730	0.04507 km²	1,539
Zone 80
Barangay 731	0.03627 km²	2,916
Barangay 732	0.02318 km²	1,974
Barangay 733	0.04084 km²	4,303
Barangay 734	0.01504 km²	902
Barangay 735	0.02234 km²	2,063
Barangay 736	0.01458 km²	3,806
Barangay 737	0.01198 km²	2,209
Barangay 738	0.03285 km²	3,047
Barangay 739	0.02586 km²	4,530
Barangay 740	0.02993 km²	4,138
Barangay 741	0.01402 km²	1,207
Barangay 742	0.007560 km²	807
Barangay 743	0.03766 km²	1,607
Barangay 744	0.03347 km²	1,223

== Accessibility ==
The district can be directly accessed by the main roads like the Roxas Boulevard, Quirino Avenue and Taft Avenue.

The Light Rail Transit Line 1 (LRT-1) follows Taft Avenue and has two stations located in Malate, namely Vito Cruz and Quirino stations.

== Economy ==
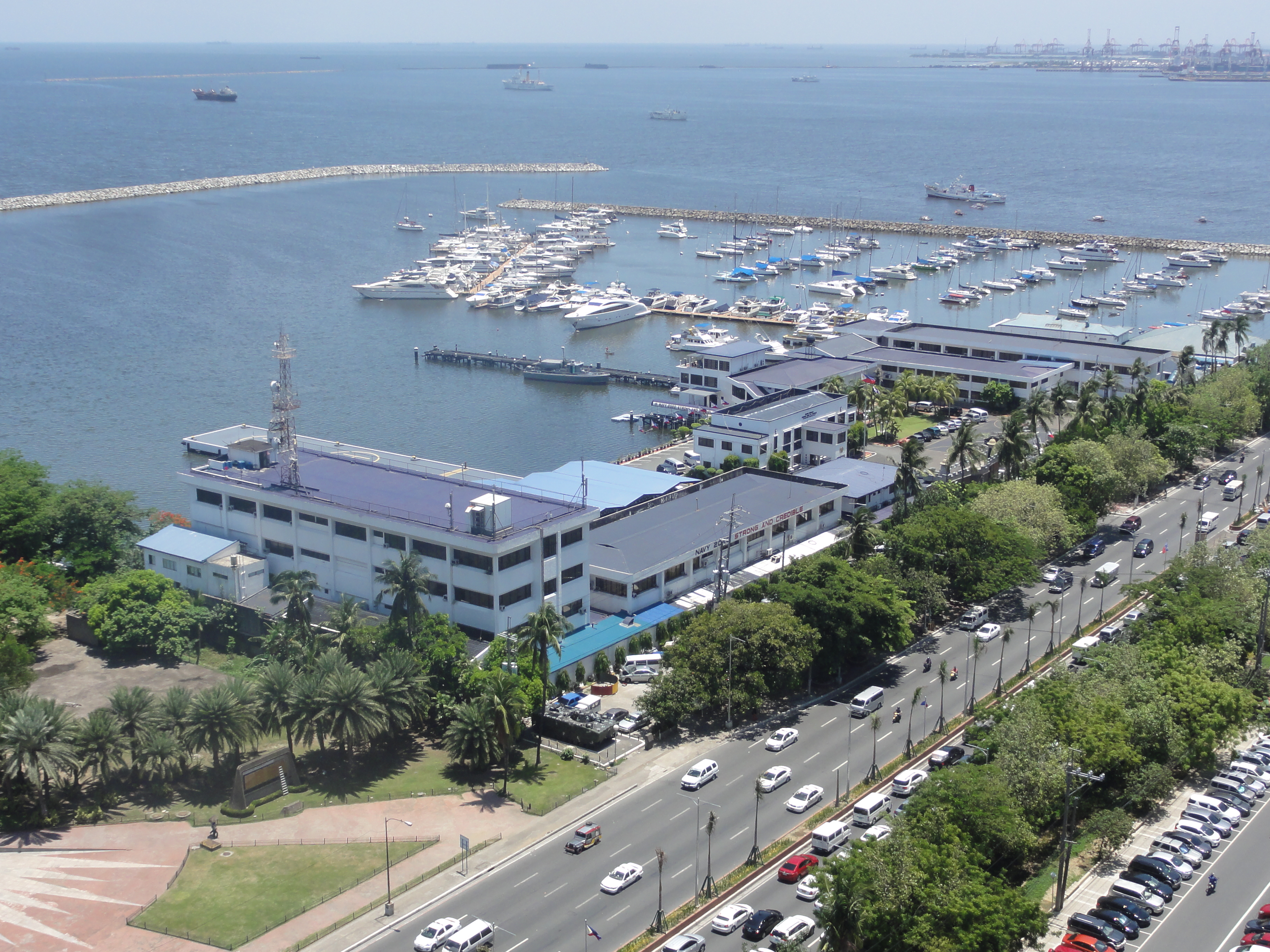
View of the Philippine Navy headquarters and the Manila Yacht Club

=== Government offices ===
Agencies like the Department of Finance (DOF), the Bangko Sentral ng Pilipinas (BSP) and lending institution LandBank of the Philippines are headquartered in the district, whilst the National Naval Command Headquarters of the Philippine Navy is at the boundary limits of Manila and the city of Pasay along Roxas Boulevard. The Bureau of Plant Industry is also headquartered in the district.

The Apostolic Nunciature to the Philippines is located in the district along Taft Avenue near Quirino Avenue. This serves as the residence of the pope during visits in the country.

== Facilities ==
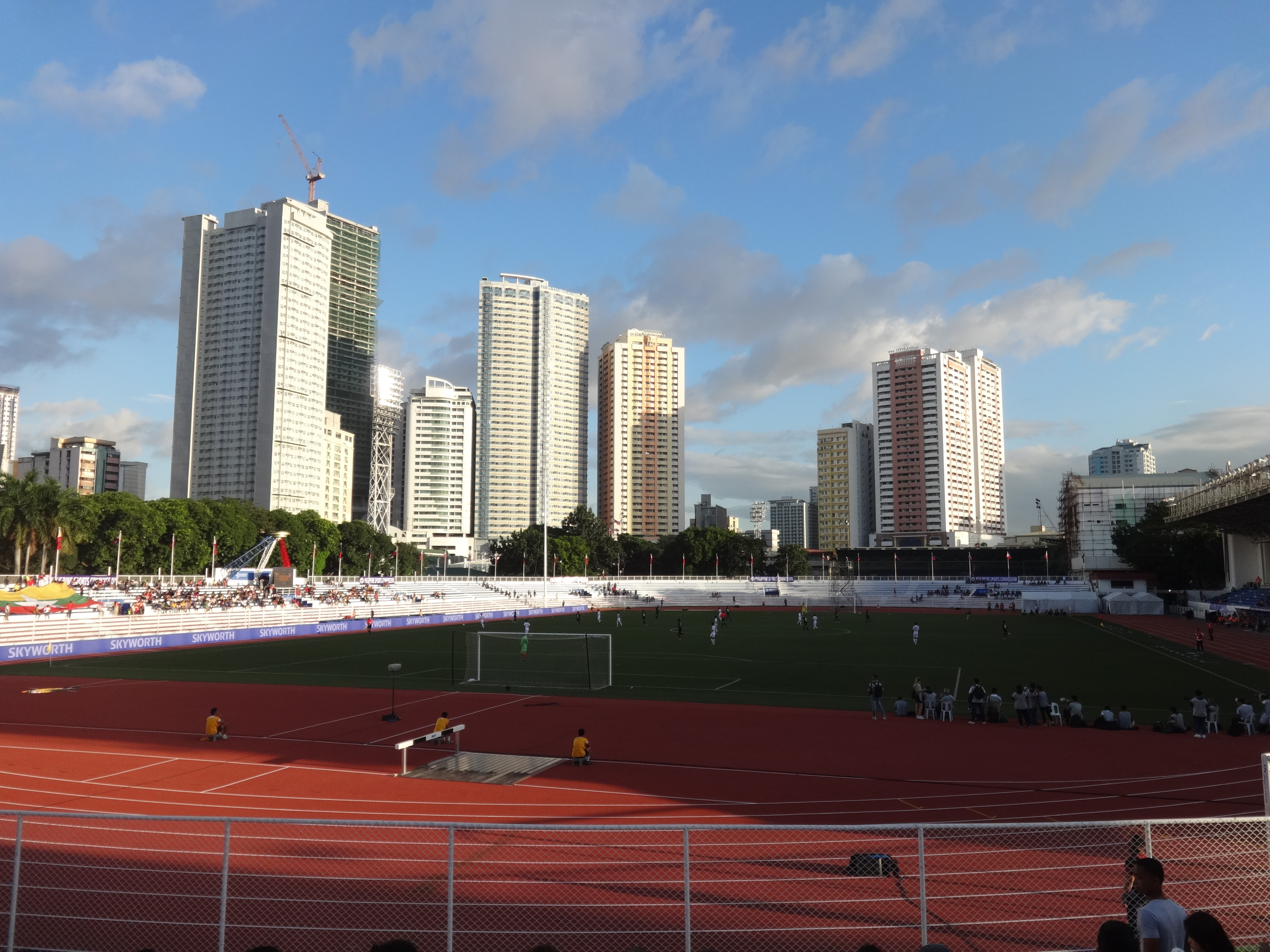
The Rizal Memorial Stadium

In the 1990s, Malate and the nearby district of Ermita had been "cleaned-up" and big businesses and resort hotels have sprouted in the district.

Harrison Plaza, Manila's first enclosed modern mall, was located in the Malate district.

There is one public hospital, the Ospital ng Maynila Medical Center, located at the corner of Roxas Boulevard and Quirino Avenue. It serves the 5th legislative district of Manila.

=== Recreation ===
The district is also home to the Philippine's first sports stadium, the Rizal Memorial Sports Complex, and the country's premiere zoological park, the Manila Zoological and Botanical Garden. Promenades and parks by the Manila Bay have been made more convenient and safe with the opening of the Manila Baywalk area and the renovated Plaza Rajah Sulayman. A portion of the Cultural Center of the Philippines Complex also lies within the district.

The district contains a red-light district. A Koreatown could also be found in the district. The aesthetics in Malate Church shows the only unique combination of Mexican Baroque and Philippine Mudejar (Christianized Islamic Art) in Asia.

== Education and scholarly activity ==
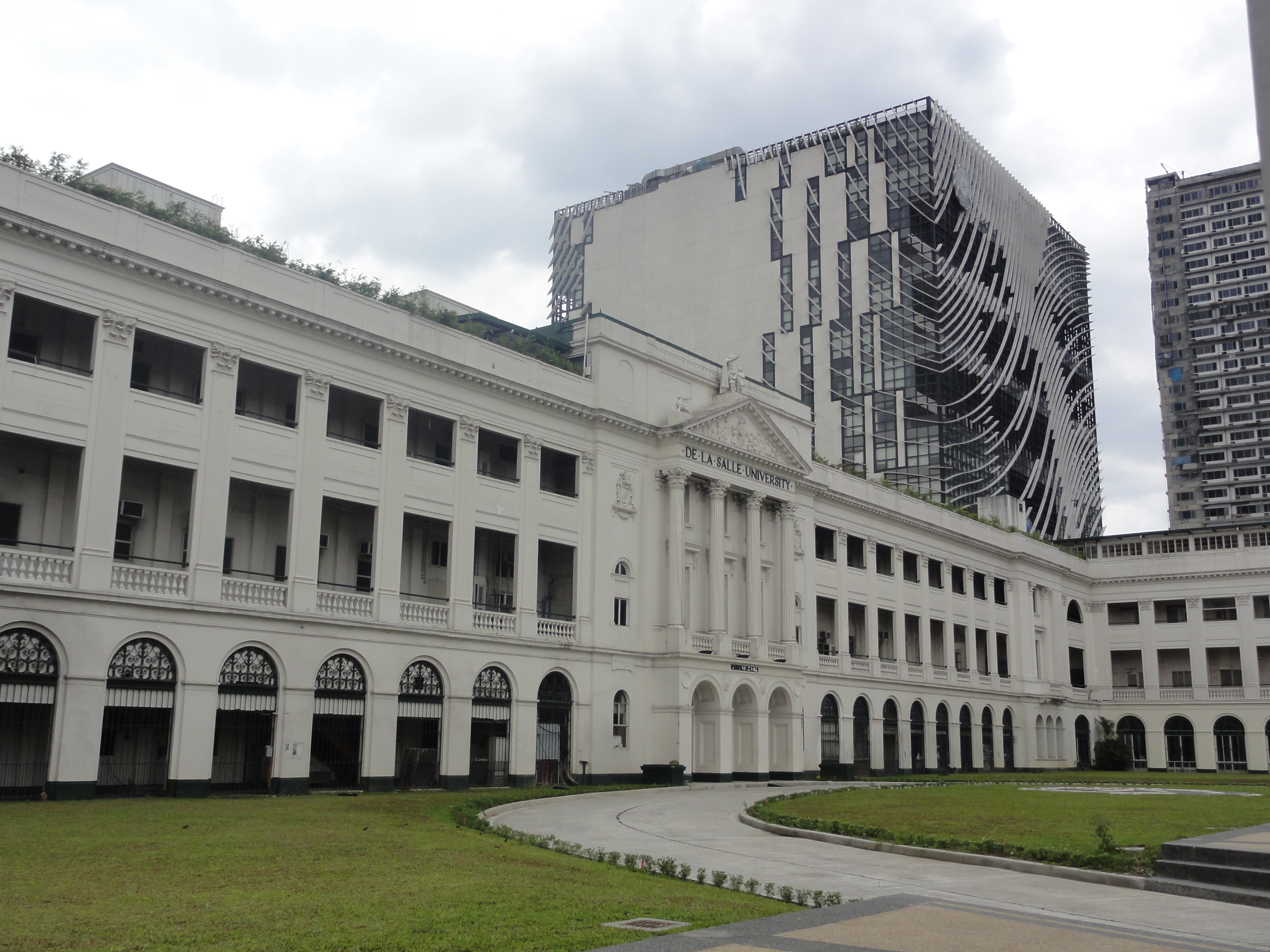
St. La Salle Hall and Henry Sy Sr. Hall of De La Salle University

Education in Malate is mostly provided by private schools. Several educational institutions which are part of the University Belt are located in Malate, these are the De La Salle University, De La Salle – College of Saint Benilde, Philippine Christian University, Philippine Women's University, St. Paul University Manila and St. Scholastica's College Manila. Prominent secondary schools in Malate are the Jesus Reigns Christian Academy, Jose Abad Santos Memorial School and the Malate Catholic School. Doña Aurora Quezon Elementary School and Epifanio delos Santos Elementary School are the public schools located in the district.

== Notable residents ==
- Herminio A. Astorga
- Kim Atienza
- Chi Atienza
- Beethoven Del Valle Bunagan a.k.a. Michael V.
- Eugene Domingo
- Tina Monzon-Palma
- Iñigo Pascual
- Piolo Pascual
- Carlos Yulo
- Tiya Dely

== Gallery ==
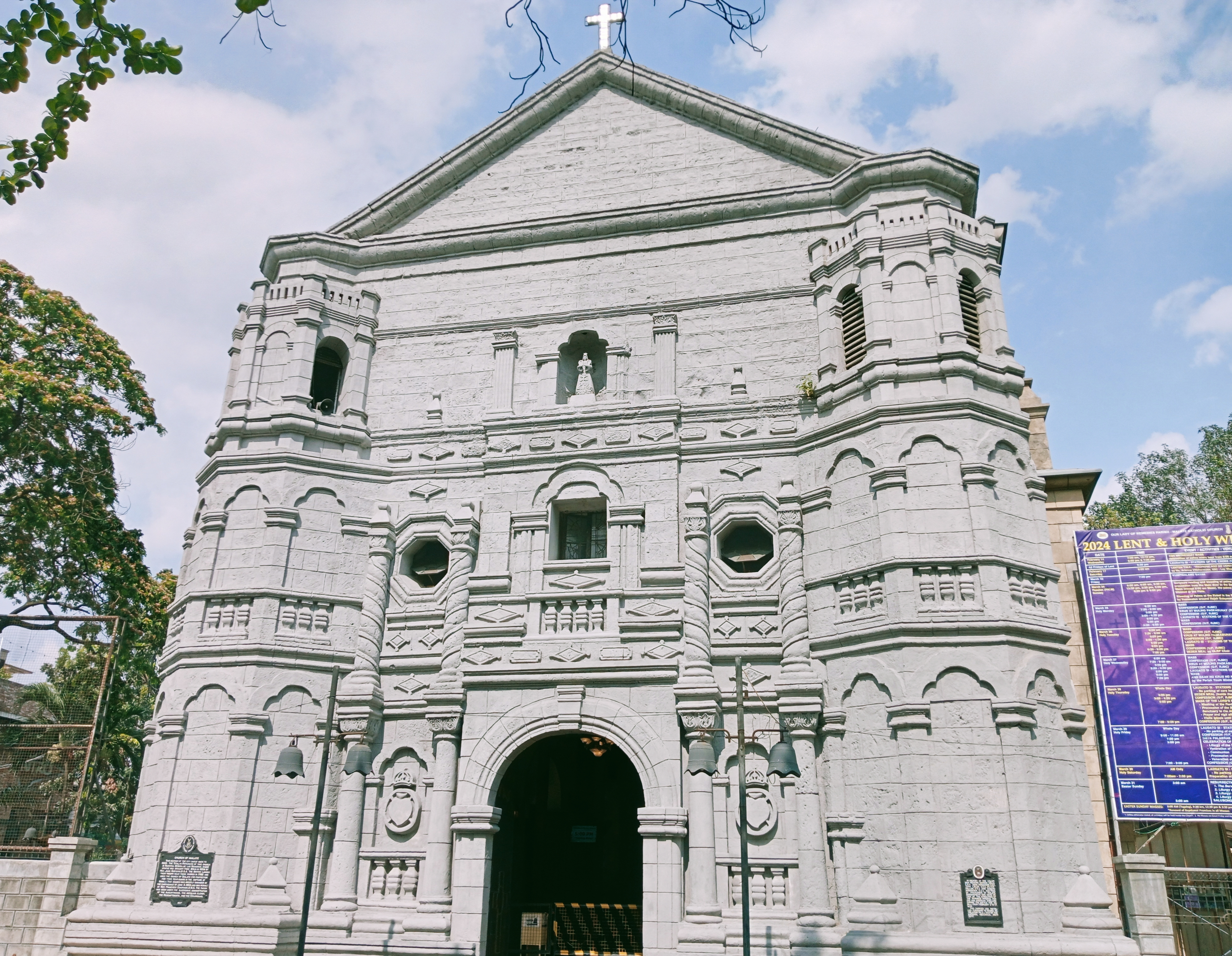
Malate Church

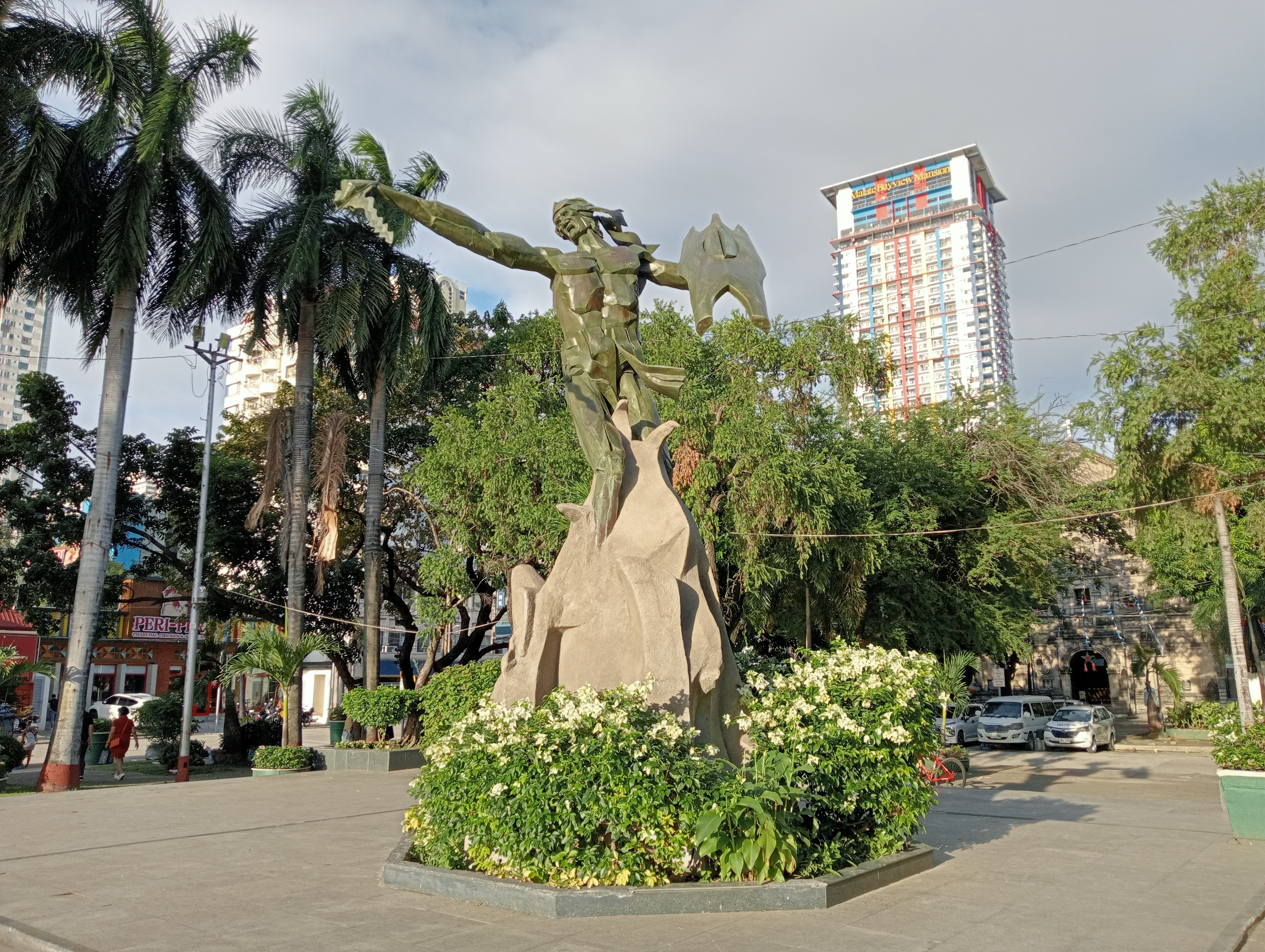
Rajah Sulayman Monument

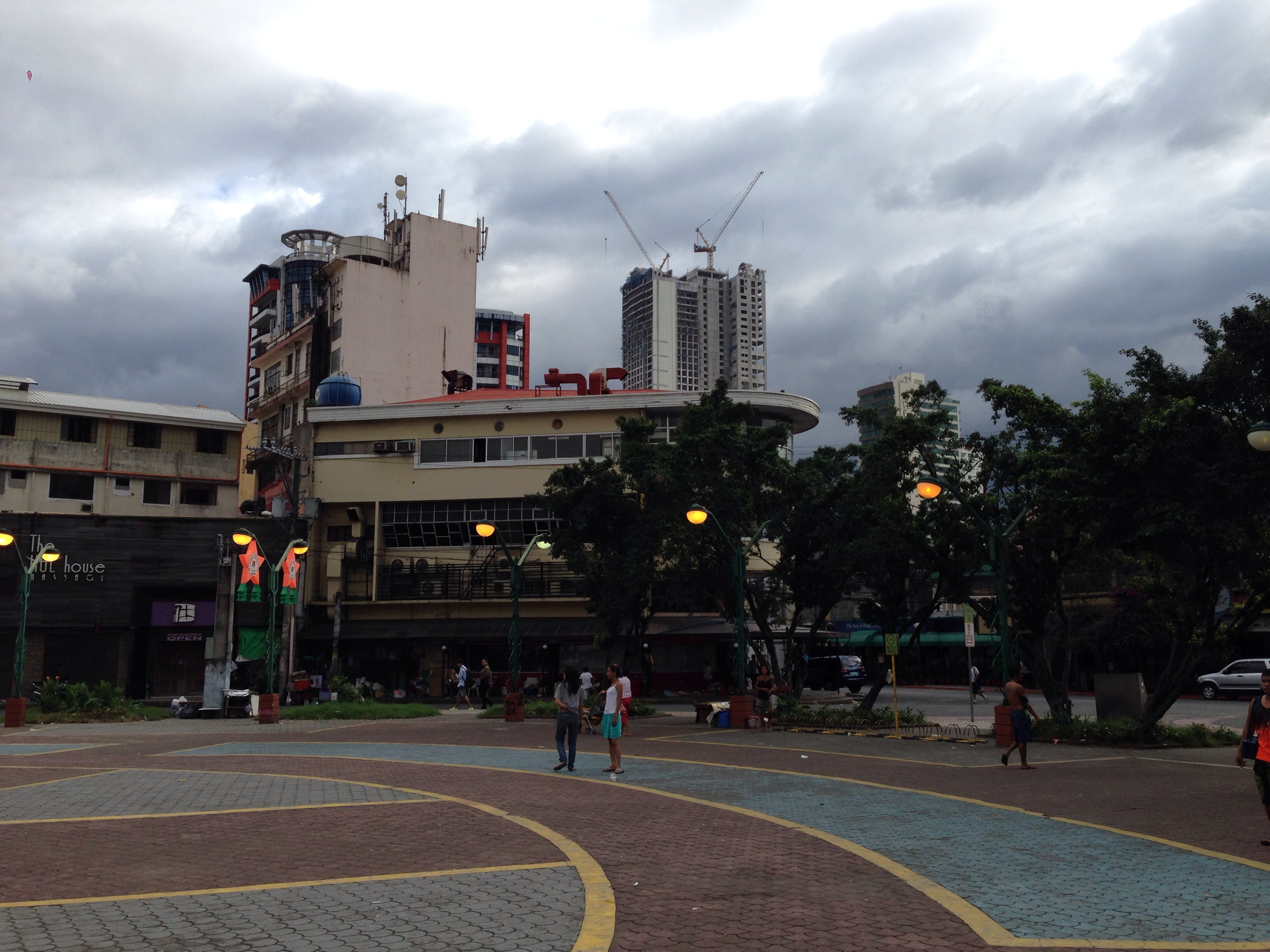
Remedios Circle

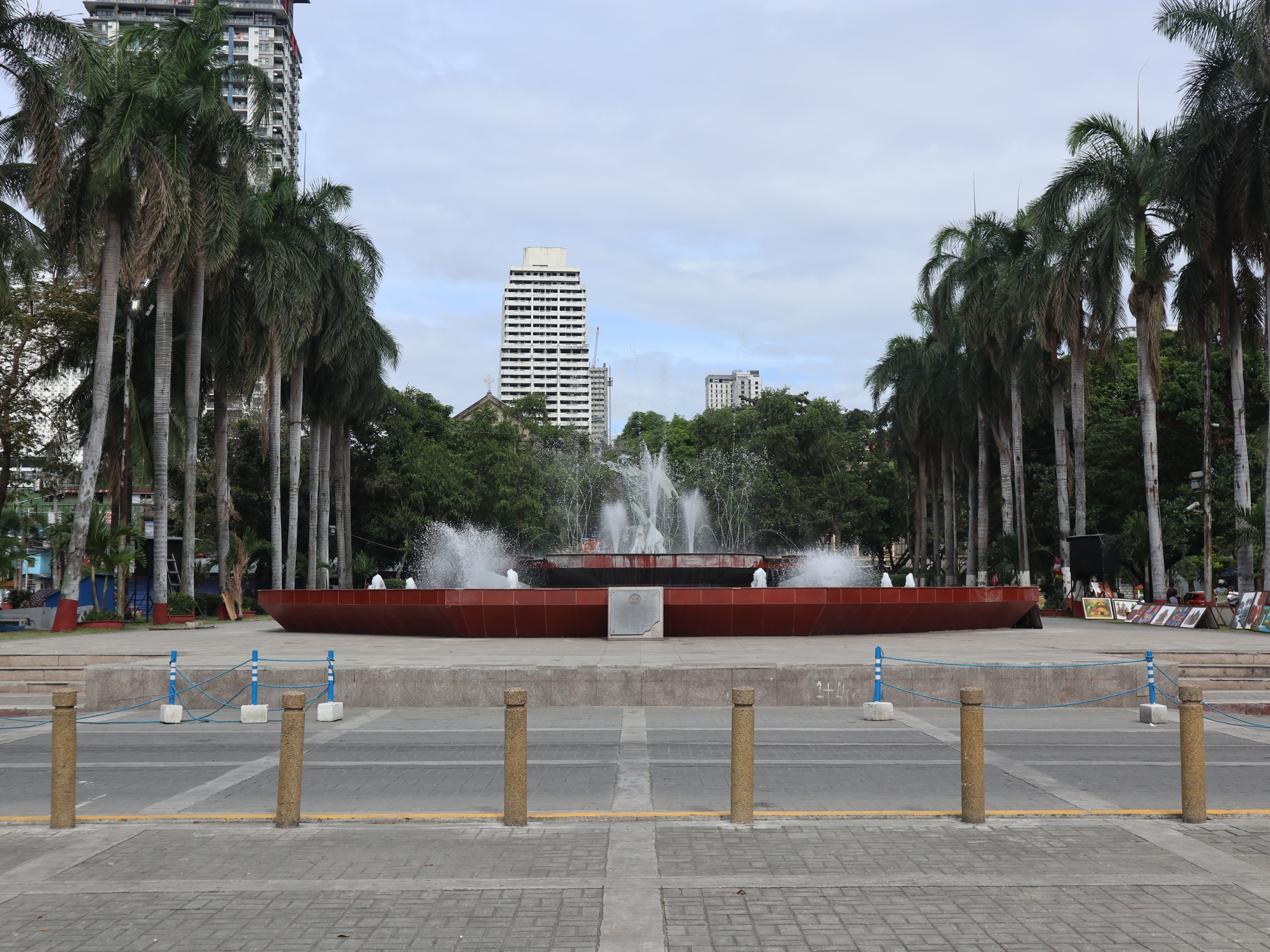
Plaza Rajah Sulayman

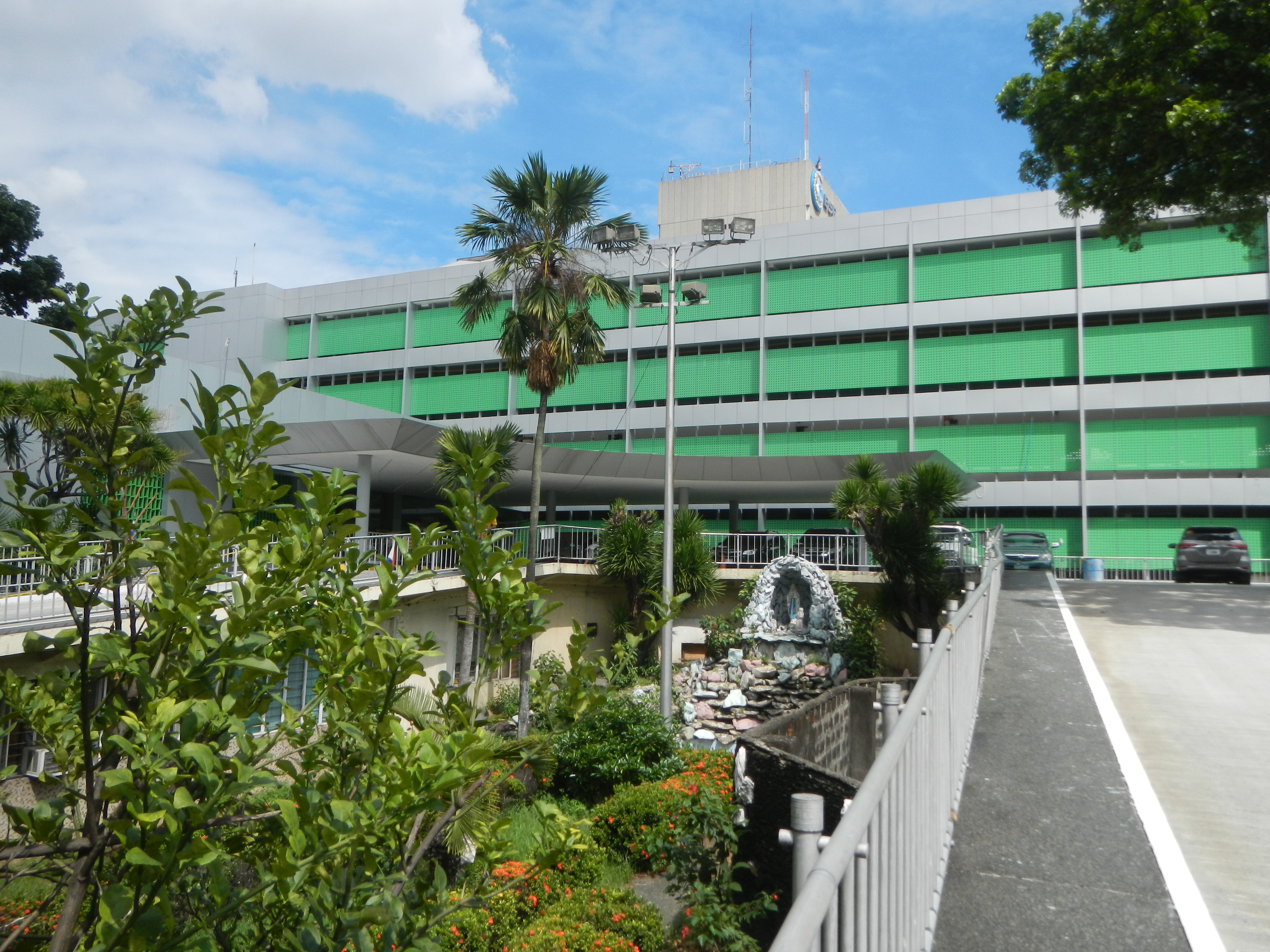
Ospital ng Maynila Medical Center

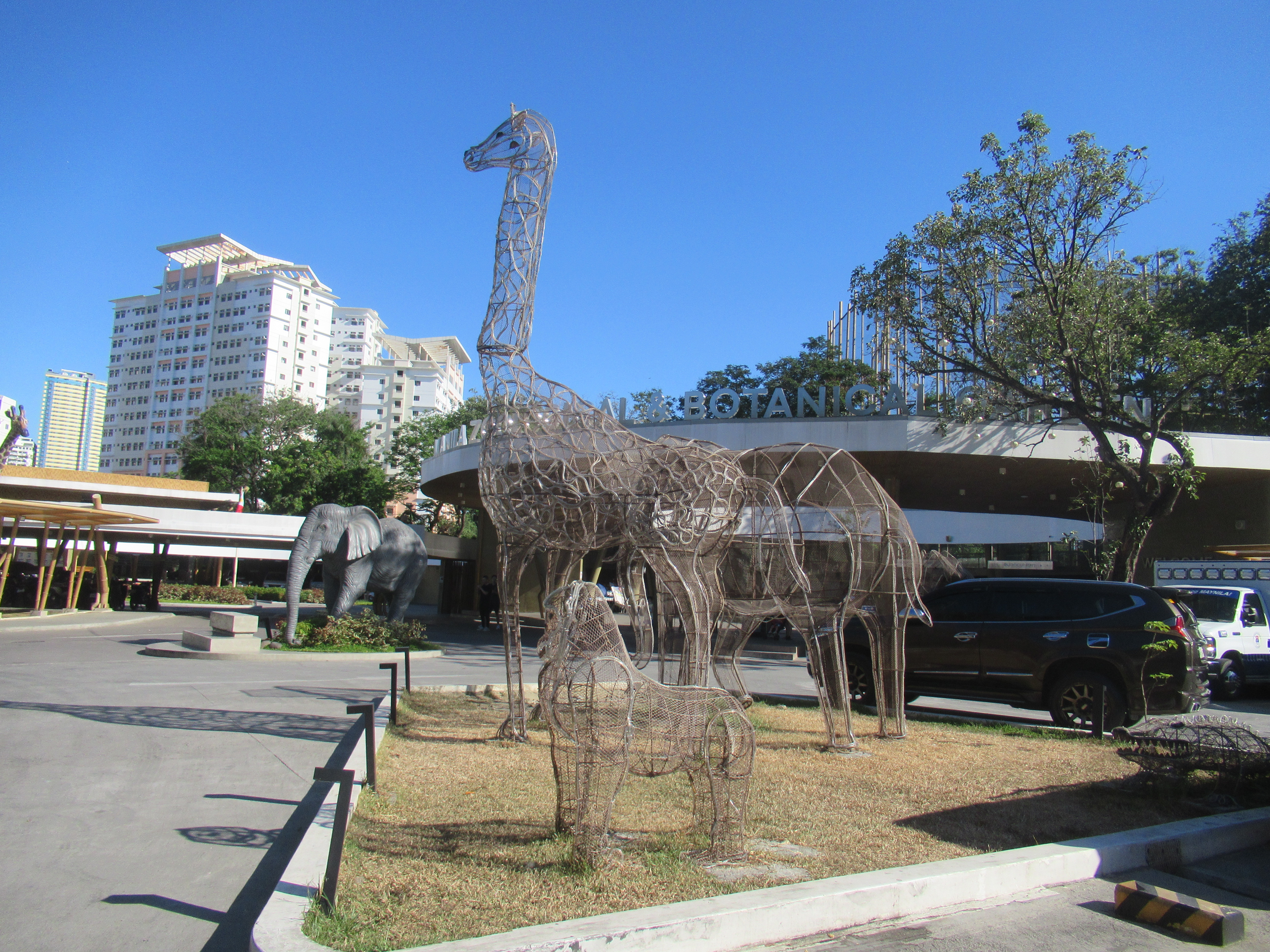
Manila Zoo

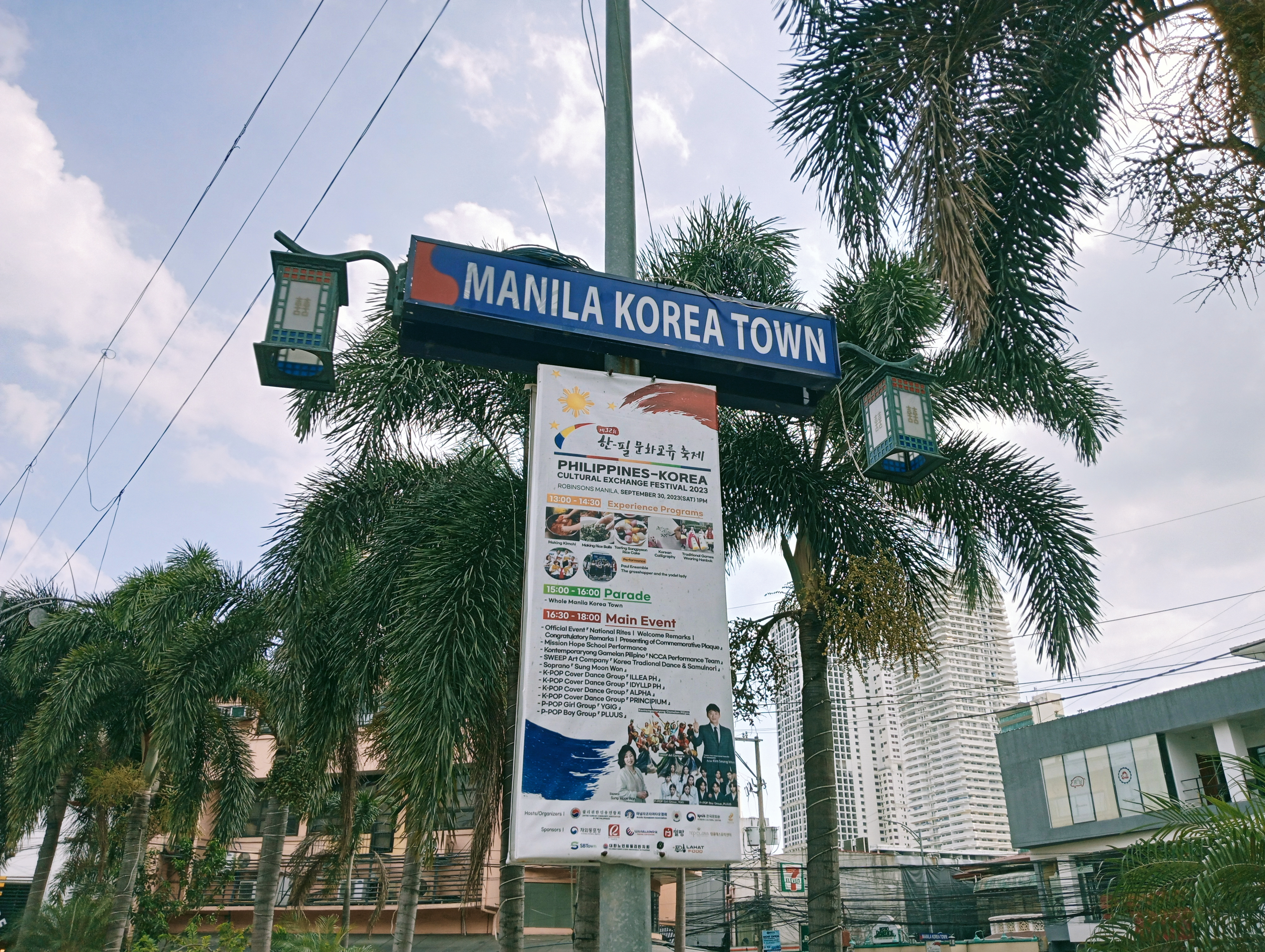
Manila Korea Town

== Notes ==
- By Sword and Fire: The Destruction of Manila in World War II, 3 February-3 March 1945 by Alphonso J. Aluit (1994) Bookmark, Inc. © 1994 National Commission for Culture and the Arts ISBN 971-569-162-5
