= Harrison Plaza =

Shopping mall in Manila, Philippines

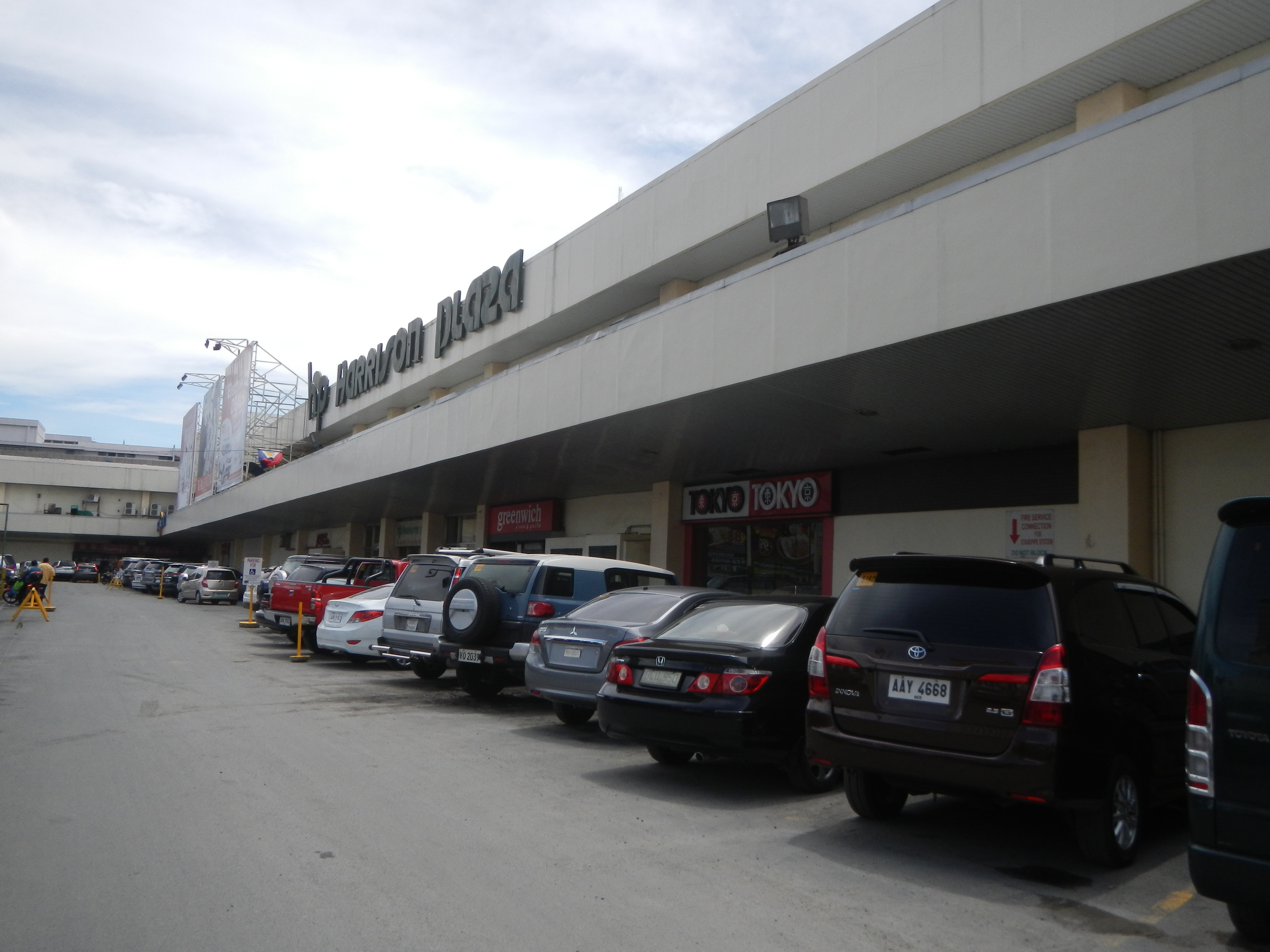
- The former mall in 2016
- Location: Malate, Manila, Philippines
- Coordinates: 14°33′45.5″N 120°59′23″E
- Address: Adriatico Street cor. Ocampo Street
- Opened: 1976; 50 years ago
- Closed: December 31, 2019; 6 years ago
- Manager: Tourist Trade and Travel Corporation (from Martel family)
- Owner: City Government of Manila
- Num. of stores: More than 200
- Num. of anchor tenants: 4
- Floor area: 178,000 m^{2} (1,920,000 sq ft)
- Floors: 2
- Parking: Open carpark

Harrison Plaza (HP) was a shopping mall situated along Adriatico Street corner Ocampo Street in the district of Malate in Manila, Philippines. Opened in 1976, and closed at the end of 2019, it was the first modern, major shopping mall in the area. The shopping mall has been demolished to make way for a redevelopment of the site into a residential complex with a shopping center called SM Harrison Plaza by SM Prime Holdings.

== History ==
=== Background and early years ===
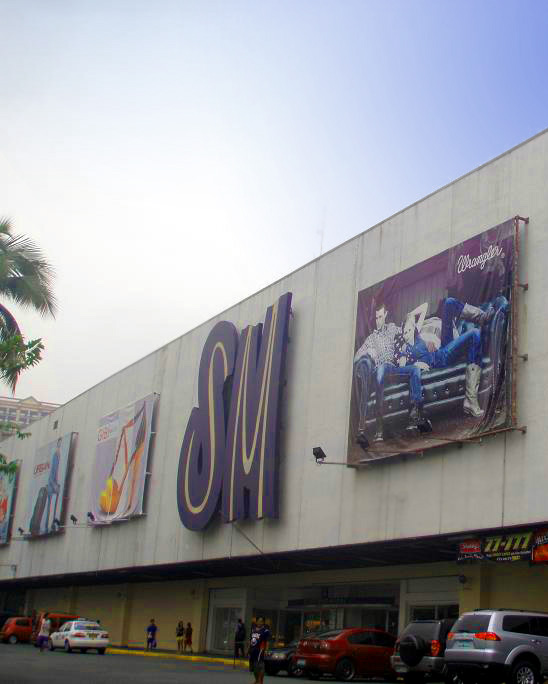
SM Department Store in Harrison Plaza

The property was built on a former cemetery that was destroyed during World War II and subsequently cleared of graves. Before its commercial development, the area was historically known as Fort San Antonio Abad, Harrison Park, and Ermita Cemetery.

Harrison Plaza opened in 1976 and is widely regarded as the first modern and fully air-conditioned shopping mall in the Philippines, following the opening of Ali Mall. The Martel family leased the 7-hectare (750,000 sq ft) lot from the city government of Manila to build the complex.

=== Fire and reopening ===
After the mall was razed by a fire, it was shuttered for renovations from 1982 to 1984. Upon reopening to the public in 1984, the complex expanded its offerings to include a cinema, amusement rides, a jai alai fronton (which operated until it was converted to an SM Hypermarket in 2010), a fountain, a Catholic chapel, and later a hotel in the 1990s. The mall was anchored by major Philippine department store chains, primarily SM Store and Rustan's.

=== Decline and SM buyout ===
Throughout the 2000s and 2010s, as competing developers like SM, Ayala, Robinsons, and Megaworld built modern mega-malls across the metropolis, Harrison Plaza saw very few upgrades. The mall and its immediate surroundings eventually suffered from urban decay and squalor.

In June 2016, it was reported that SM Prime Holdings was planning to invest ₱39.44 billion to redevelop the mall and put up business process outsourcing offices and residential towers in the Harrison Plaza complex. The firm is partnering with the city government of Manila, which has an economic interest in the redevelopment project.

In April 2018, SM Prime Holdings finalized a deal to buy out the Martel family from its contract with the City of Manila to redevelop and manage Harrison Plaza. Since the shopping center was in need of redevelopment and lagged behind other malls in the metro, SM Prime Holdings plans to build a new shopping center with a residential condominium above it.

=== Closure and demolition ===
Harrison Plaza on January 1, 2020

On November 14, 2019, the Martel family formally notified tenants that Harrison Plaza would cease operations on December 31, 2019, granting them a grace period until January 31, 2020, to clear out their spaces. Following its closure, the structure sat dormant until it was fully demolished in October 2021 to clear the site.

== Redevelopment plan ==
On April 1, 2026, SM Prime announced it would be investing ₱6 billion for the construction of a new shopping mall on the original site of the Harrison Plaza. The new mall to be named "SM Harrison Plaza" is projected to be completed in 2027 and will have a floor area of at least 200,000 m^{2} (2,200,000 sq ft).

== Tenants ==
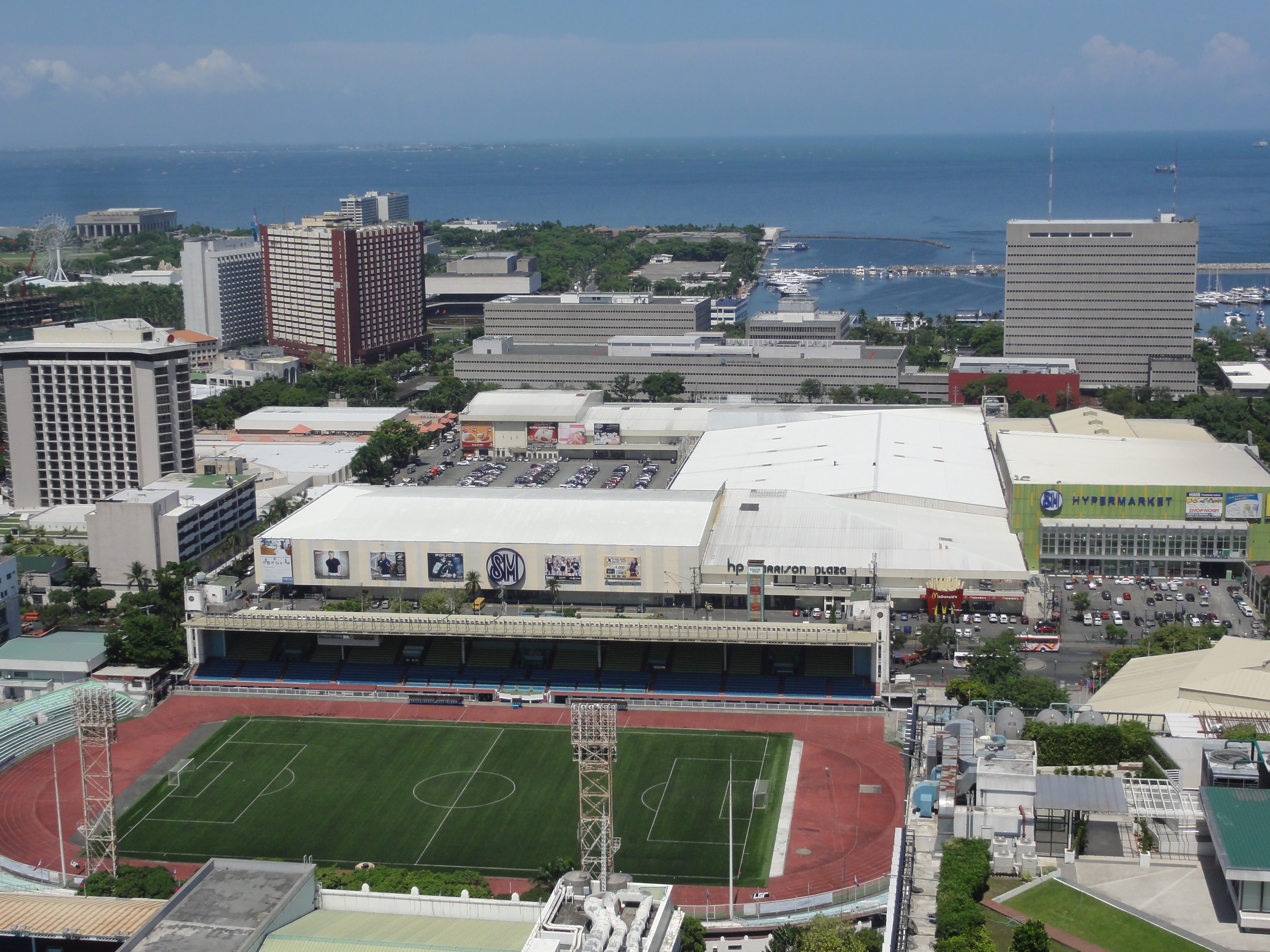
Harrison Plaza in 2015

At its commercial peak, the original Harrison Plaza housed over 180 retail stores, eateries, service outlets, a supermarket, and four movie theaters. The complex notably featured a jai alai fronton; however, following the Philippine government's ban on the sport, the fronton was subsequently repurposed and replaced by an SM Hypermarket outlet in 2010.

== In popular culture ==
- The 2019 film The Mall, The Merrier was largely filmed in and around Harrison Plaza where it was used to portray the fictional Tamol Mall, where mysterious incidents occur.

== See also ==
- Ali Mall
- List of largest shopping malls
- List of largest shopping malls in the Philippines
- List of shopping malls in Metro Manila
