= Jose Abad Santos Memorial School =

School in Manila, Philippines

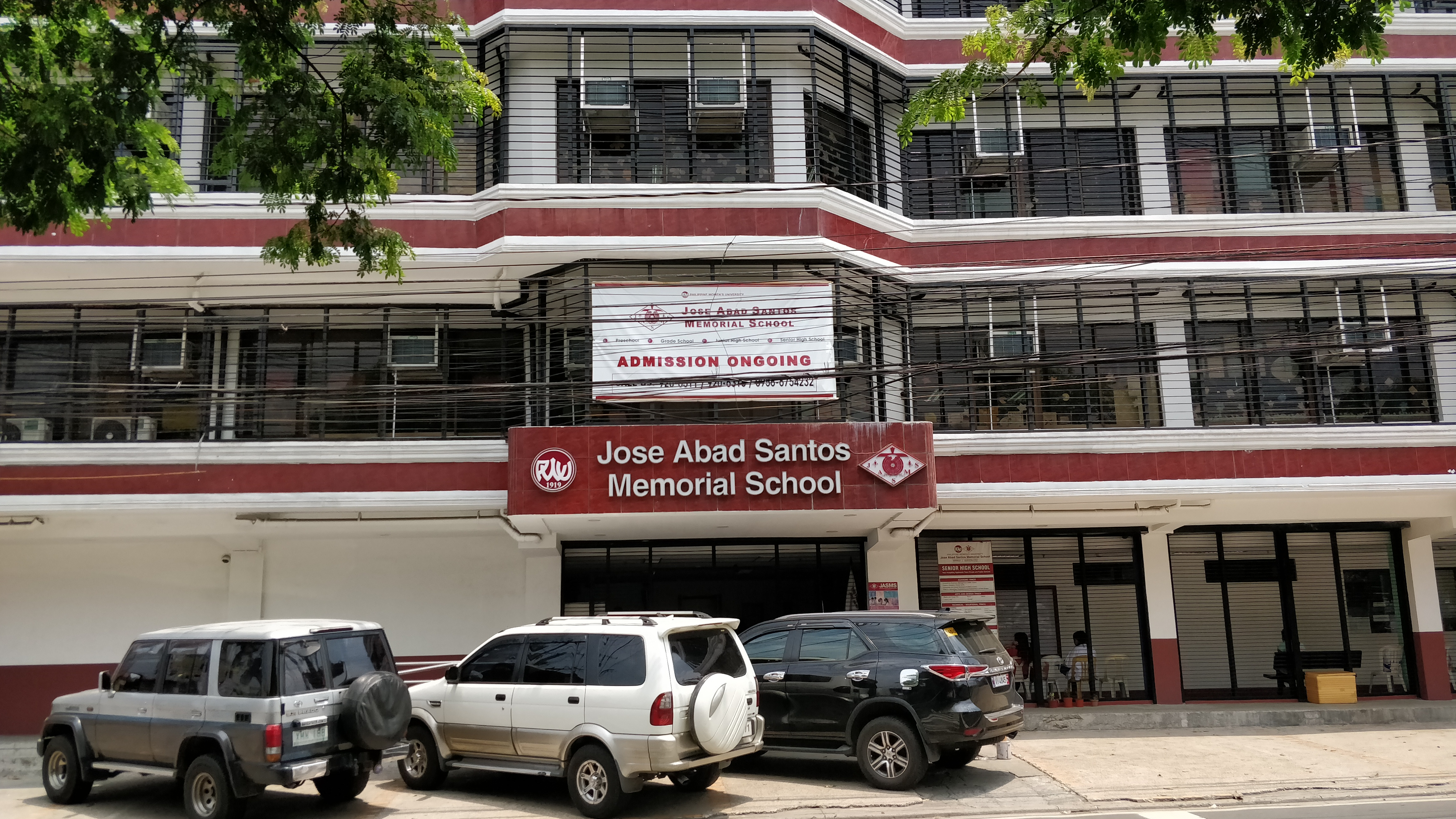
- Quezon City Campus at Barangay Bahay Toro
- P.H. Lim St., Malate, Manila; 51 Congressional Avenue, Project 8, Quezon City

Information
- Type: Private, Progressive Nonsectarian, Coeducational
- Motto: Learning To Be Free
- Established: 1933
- Administrator: Remedios H. Cruz, Executive Director for Basic Education
- Principal: Loreliza V. Catuiran (Manila), Diana Gutierrez (Quezon City)
- Grades: K to 12
- Colors: Maroon, and White
- Accreditation: PAASCU (JASMS Manila)
- Hymns: The JASMS Song, The University Hymn
- Website: www.pwu.edu.ph/basiced.html

The Jose Abad Santos Memorial School, or JASMS, is the basic education institution (Kindergarten to Grade 12) of the Philippine Women's University (PWU). JASMS offers preschool, elementary, and secondary education. The school is an acknowledged pioneer in progressive education developed from and for the Philippine democratic experience based on a unique approach described as learning to be free by its founding director, the late Doreen Barber Gamboa.

Presently, the JASMS system occupies three campuses: the nursery (3-year-olds)-to–Grade 6 levels of PWU JASMS Manila (formerly JASMS Indiana) located on Pilar Hidalgo-Lim Street in Malate, Manila; the PWU JASMS Manila High School (Grade 7 to Grade 12) in the PWU main campus on Taft Avenue in Malate, Manila; and the nursery-to–Grade 12 campus of JASMS Quezon City (QC) on Congressional Avenue in Quezon City.

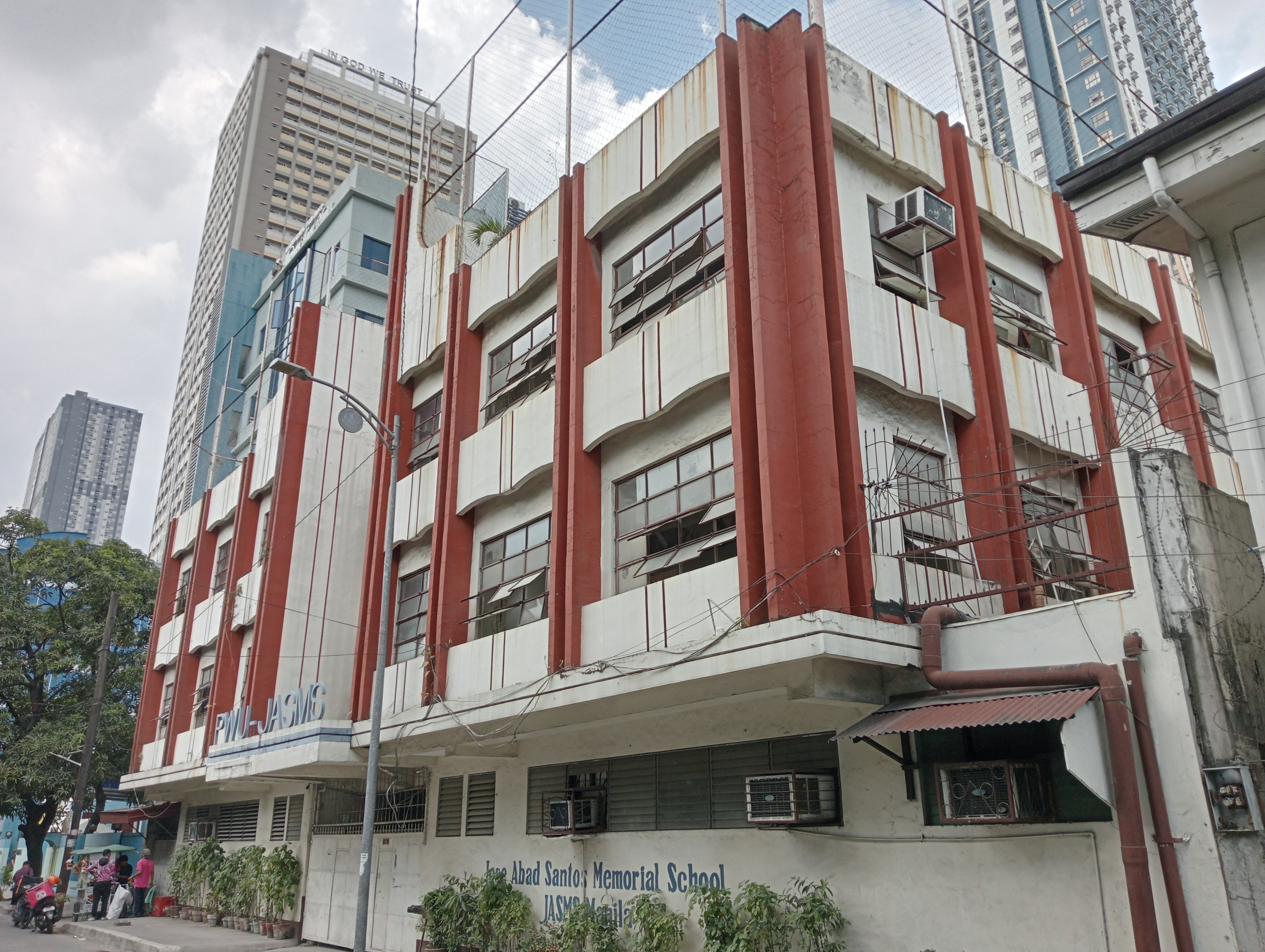
Jose Abad Santos Memorial School in Malate, Manila

== History ==
=== Birth of JASMS ===
JASMS evolved from the preschool (est. 1933) of the Philippine Women's University (PWU) under the leadership of President Benitez. She then hired Doreen Barber Gamboa and Priscilla Abaya to first set up and run the preschool in the fenced-in area which was the PWU gymnasium in Manila. Mrs. Gamboa was of Irish descent and had trained in psychology.

Gamboa and Abaya noticed that most of the children in the new PWU preschool were being held back from fully exploring the books, art materials, blocks, and play facilities provided them in school. They wouldn't participate in the singing, art, and story-telling activities led by the two young teachers—except for three young boys who raced through all the materials and eagerly participated in all the activities. The teachers noticed that these three boys were the only ones who were dropped off at school without yayas (nannies), parents, or relatives.

First, the teachers sought the cooperation of over-protective parents to free the children from their yayas and other "watchers". Next, they expanded the physical set-up of the classroom to include the outdoors. The children were encouraged to play vigorously, explore their environment, and experiment widely with the materials that the environment had to offer. Movement was encouraged and employed, rather than restricted. As the population of the school grew, so did the popularity of the school with the parents. It was the parents themselves who petitioned for the preschool's expansion into a bona fide grade school department.

In 1949, the PWU elementary department was renamed the Jose Abad Santos Memorial School (JASMS) in honor of José Abad Santos, Chief Justice of the Supreme Court of the Philippines and chairman of the PWU board of trustees, who was executed by the Japanese invading forces during World War II.

Also around this time, a reorganization of the elementary school (on Taft Avenue). Two schools developed out of this initial effort: JASMS in Manila and later (1956) in Quezon City, both coeducational from Nursery to Grade 12. Both are new referred to as PWU JASMS.

In essence, JASMS has evolved into an educational environment where students, teachers, and parents can feel and see for themselves the warmth and friendliness that permeates the school community and where learning is a joy—freed from rigid pressures to conform or to be subjected to comparisons that harm one's sense of self. Feeling good about himself or herself, the child is thus set free to move explore the world as a fully engaged and self-principled citizen.

How the young develop in attitude, behavior, and relationships as they grow into personhood and the kinds of motivations and depth of wisdom as they grow into maturity are the focus of the school's attention and concern and, ultimately, the inspiration of its current proponents to sustain the pioneering work at JASMS.

=== Milestones ===
The Jose Abad Santos Memorial School (JASMS) is the outcome of the many years of work that Doreen Barber Gamboa had with children. She was greatly inspired by Francisca Tirona Benitez who was a co-founder and then President of the Philippine Women's University (PWU), the first college for Women in Asia (est. 1919).

1933

Nursery class opens for children 18 months to 3 years of age under the Elementary and Training Department of the PWU at A. Flores Street in Ermita, Manila

1936

Kindergarten expands into the Child Development Department headed by Doreen Gamboa

1938

Boarding nursery is set up for children whose parents were working or not in the city

1941

Experimental Grade 1 is opened when parents ask that the child development approach be carried on into the grade school

The class is abruptly closed by the onset of WWII but Mrs. Gamboa sets up a kindergarten and ungraded primary classes in an old house at the corner of Taft Avenue and Tennessee (now Malvar Street) in Malate, Manila.

1944

PWU building was burned during the war

Quonset huts are built to house the kindergarten and elementary by day and to serve as a dormitory by night. Fronting PWU, these huts were located at the site of what would later be referred to as the JASMS Annex.

Other big houses undamaged by the war became the classrooms of the children. One such house was owned by the late Chief Justice Abad Santos, once PWU board chair, who was executed by the enemy during the war.

1949

Doreen Gamboa leads the rebuilding of the preschool and elementary department following the principles of child development; the school is named the Jose Abad Santos Memorial School (JASMS), after the late Chief Justice

1950s

JASMS Manila opens at a new site along Indiana (now Pilar Hidalgo-Lim) Street in Malate but still maintains the (Annex) Taft Avenue facilities for younger children

1956

JASMS in Quezon City (QC) is established through the generosity of Earl Carroll, president of the Philamlife Assurance Company, to serve the new communities opening up in the vicinity such as the Philamlife Homes, West Triangle Homes (then called DBP homes) and the government housing projects.

The new JASMS QC with Mrs. Gamboa as director, offers preschool to Grade 7.

1961

JASMS QC high school opens an experimental high school.

2004

JASMS Manila opens high school with a class of 7 boys, graduates from JASMS Grade VII, and one girl from Bangladesh.

2010

JASMS Manila Preschool to Grade III classes are moved to the Unlad Building across the street from the original JASMS Annex

JASMS QC is cited as the Quezon City Gawad Parangal Most Outstanding Institution by the QC government

2012

JASMS Manila and the PWU High School and JASMS QC are selected by DepEd to model the Grade 11 curriculum

2013

JASMS Manila is granted Level II re-accreditation by the Federation of Accrediting Agencies of the Philippines in (2013–2018) after the school met all the requirements of the Philippine Accrediting Association of Schools, Colleges and Universities (PAASCU); the all-girls PWU High School is accredited by PAASCU (2013-2016) with Level 1 status.

2014

JASMS Manila High School (Co-Ed) and the PWU High School (all girls) are merged in the Leon Guinto wing of the PWU Main Campus on Taft Avenue and preschool and primary classes are moved back to the JASMS building on Pilar Hidalgo Lim Street; the high school is renamed the PWU JASMS Manila High School and is co-educational

2015

PWU JASMS Manila and JASMS QC are granted permits by the Department of Education to open Senior High School (Grades 11 and 12).

2017

JASMS Quezon City campus relocated from its original site in EDSA, West Triangle to Congressional Avenue in Project 8, Quezon City.

JASMS Grade School and PWU JASMS High School were granted 5-year Accreditation by PAASCU (2017-2022).

PWU JASMS Manila's award-winning Rondalla was chosen to represent the Philippines in a cultural exchange program in Moscow and St. Petersburg.

== Mission & Vision ==
=== Mission ===
The development of a wholesome person, participating member of the home, the community and the world through: experience in group living, finding a variety of opportunities for creative expression, confidence to explore and valuing the thinking-questing process, acquiring skills to move ahead in life, sense of fulfillment in accomplishment, respect for the individual's worth, consideration for others and the beauty in cooperative effort with reverence and appreciation for all manifestations of life and the realization that a child grows up only once and the need to let his childhood would be a happy one.

=== Vision ===
The children are our future, the builders of our nation: belonging, contributing with initiative and responsibility; with sense of personal and social worthwhileness, working with others cooperatively; God-fearing and imbued with reverence for life.

== JASMS Parents Teachers Organization ==
The PWU-JASMS Parent-Teachers Council (Manila Campus) and JASMS Parents' Association (Quezon City Campus) composed of parents and teacher-counterparts who look after some of the school's needs and facilitate parent participation in the education program where appropriate.

== The JASMS Rondalla ==
Jose Abad Santos Memorial School- JASMS, Rondalla ensemble was organized April 2007 by teacher Noli Rodriguez, a high school math teacher . JASMS Rondalla is offered free to all students of JASMS Manila from Grade 4 to Grade 12.

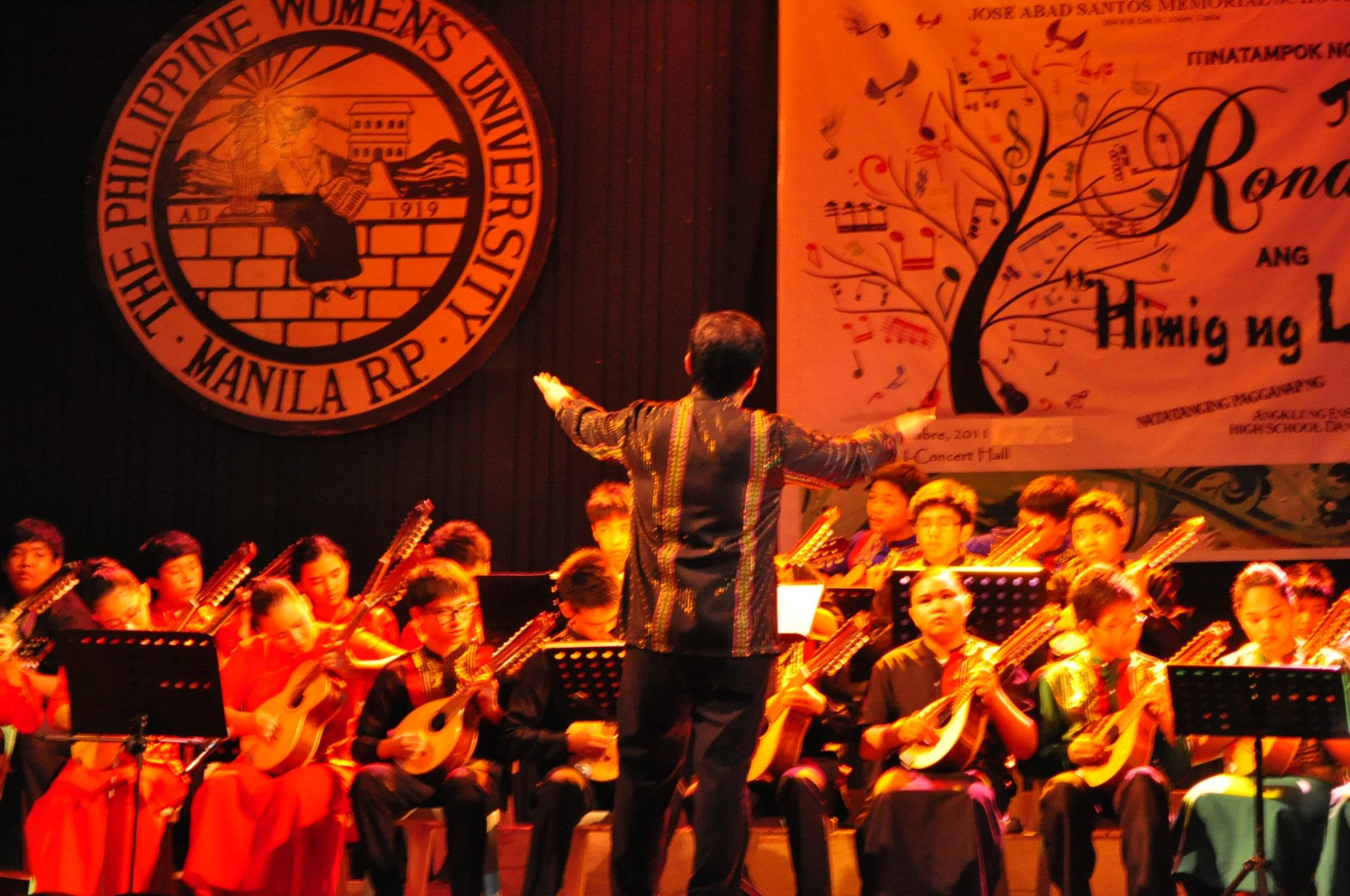
A JASMS Rondalla Concert

JASMS Rondalla's aim is to give life to Filipino folk songs through the music of the different rondalla instruments and the promotion and preservation of Filipino music through rondalla.

In 2015, the JASMS Rondalla won the Grand Prize of the National Music Competitions for Young Artists (NAMCYA) organized by the NAMCYA Foundation.

In November 2016, the PWU JASMS Junior Rondalla won the Best Interpretation and Grand Prize of the National Music Competitions for Young Artists (NAMCYA) organized by the NAMCYA Foundation.

=== JASMS Rondalla Concert Series ===
The JASMS Rondalla holds annual concerts under the theme "Himig ng Lahi" performed at the PWU Concert Hall.

== Notable alumni ==
- Bea Alonzo (Phylbert Angelie Ranollo) - actress, and singer
- L.A. Lopez - actor, and singer
- Eduardo Manalo, third and current executive minister of Iglesia ni Cristo (INC)
- Janus del Prado - actor, and comedian
- Meryll Soriano - actress
- Adel Tamano, lawyer and politician, 7th President of the Pamantasan ng Lungsod ng Maynila
- Dennis Trillo (Abelardo Dennis Florencio Ho) - actor, singer, and model
- Coco Martin (Rodel Luis Pacheco Nacianceno) - actor multi awarded TV Commercial voice and director
- Martin Andanar - Secretary of the Presidential Communications Operations Office
- Micaela Papa - journalist, reporter GMA news
