= Philippine Women's University =

Private university in Manila, Philippines

- Pamantasang Pambabae ng Pilipinas (Filipino)
- Former name: Philippine Women's College (1919–1932)
- Type: Private Coeducational Basic and Higher Education institution
- Established: June 9, 1919; 107 years ago
- Founders: Clara Aragon; Concepcion Aragon; Francisca Tirona Benitez; Paz Márquez-Benítez; Carolina Ocampo Palma; Mercedes Rivera; Socorro Marquez Zaballero
Academic affiliations
ACUCA ASAIHL COCOPEA IAU; IAUP PAASCU PACU	PACUCOA SMIIC WACE; WCC; WCCI; WEW
- Chairman: Victorina Amalingan Sales
- President: Marco Alfredo Benitez
- Faculty: Approx. 500
- Undergraduates: Approx. 5,000
- Location: 1743 Taft Avenue, Malate, Manila, Philippines; 14°34′27″N 120°59′23″E
- Campus: Urban Main: Malate, Manila Satellite: Congressional Avenue, Quezon City
- Alma Mater song: PWU Hymn
- Colors: Maroon and White
- Nickname: PWU Patriots
- Sporting affiliations: UCAL, WNCAA, WCSA, ISAA
- Website: www.pwu.edu.ph
- Location in Manila Location in Metro Manila Location in Luzon Location in the Philippines

Philippine Women's University (PWU) is a coeducational tertiary education school which has its main campus in Manila, Philippines. An institution exclusive for girls from its inception until the 1970s, the PWU now admits both women and men as its students.

PWU's basic education department is called the Jose Abad Santos Memorial School (PWU JASMS) and has two campuses in Manila and Quezon City.

== History ==
Philippines Historical Committee marker installed in 1952

=== Early years ===
In 1919 during the American colonial era, the Philippine Women's University was established as the Philippine Women's College (PWC) by a group of Filipino women consisting of Clara Aragon, Concepcion Aragon, Francisca Tirona Benitez, Paz Marquez Benitez, Carolina Ocampo Palma, Mercedes Rivera and Socorro Marquez Zaballero with the assistance of Filipino lawyer José Abad Santos, who drafted the university's constitution and by-laws. It had an initial enrollment of 190 students.

The American colonial government granted the Philippine Women's College university status in 1932, and was renamed as the Philippine Women's University. It was the first university for women in Asia founded by Asians. From 1928 up to the outbreak of the World War II, Philippine Women's University introduced the following programs: Home Economics, Music and Fine Arts, Social Work, Nutrition, Pharmacy and Business. In 1938, a course in Social Civic training was incorporated into the curriculum. The academic programs were based on the founders' objectives to train Filipinas in civic responsibility.

Established families from all over the Philippines who could afford higher education sent their daughters to PWU. Most institutions offering higher education at that time were exclusively for young men, like PWU's neighbor, De La Salle College. Schools for women offering higher education were operated by secular or religious sisters of the Roman Catholic Church, including PWU's neighbors, Santa Isabel College, Assumption College, St. Paul College, Manila and St. Scholastica's College. There was also the Centro Escolar de Senoritas College which predated PWU by some 12 years, having been founded in 1907. The PWU had a more 'Americanized' curriculum than the former institution.

=== Second World War and afterward ===
The Philippine Women's University survived the Japanese occupation of the Philippine islands of World War II from 1942 to 1945. For a time, classes at the PWU were held intermittently due to the extraordinary conditions imposed by the Japanese. The PWU campus, a building occupying an entire city block, was converted to a hospital, known as the 'Pagamutan ng Maynila (lit. 'Manila Hospital').

The university sustained major damage during the war and barely survived the siege during the Battle of Manila in 1945. The school resumed its operations a few months prior the granting of independence to the Philippines by the United States on July 4, 1946.

The university opened to elementary and secondary education when it founded the Jose Abad Santos Memorial School (JASMS) which now has two campuses in Manila and Quezon City and is called PWU JASMS.

=== Reform to a co-educational institution ===
The university had its first male president in 1993 with the election of Jose Conrado Benitez.

- In the 1970s, PWU started admission of male enrollees as students and became co-educational.
- In 2003, Amelia Benitez Reyes became the eighth university president.
- In 2009, the Board of Trustees appointed Alfredo Benitez Reyes as the chief executive officer. As CEO, Reyes became the de facto head of the institution. Amelia B. Reyes retired then.
- In 2011, Jose Francisco Benitez became the ninth, and second male president of the PWU.

=== Issues with STI ===
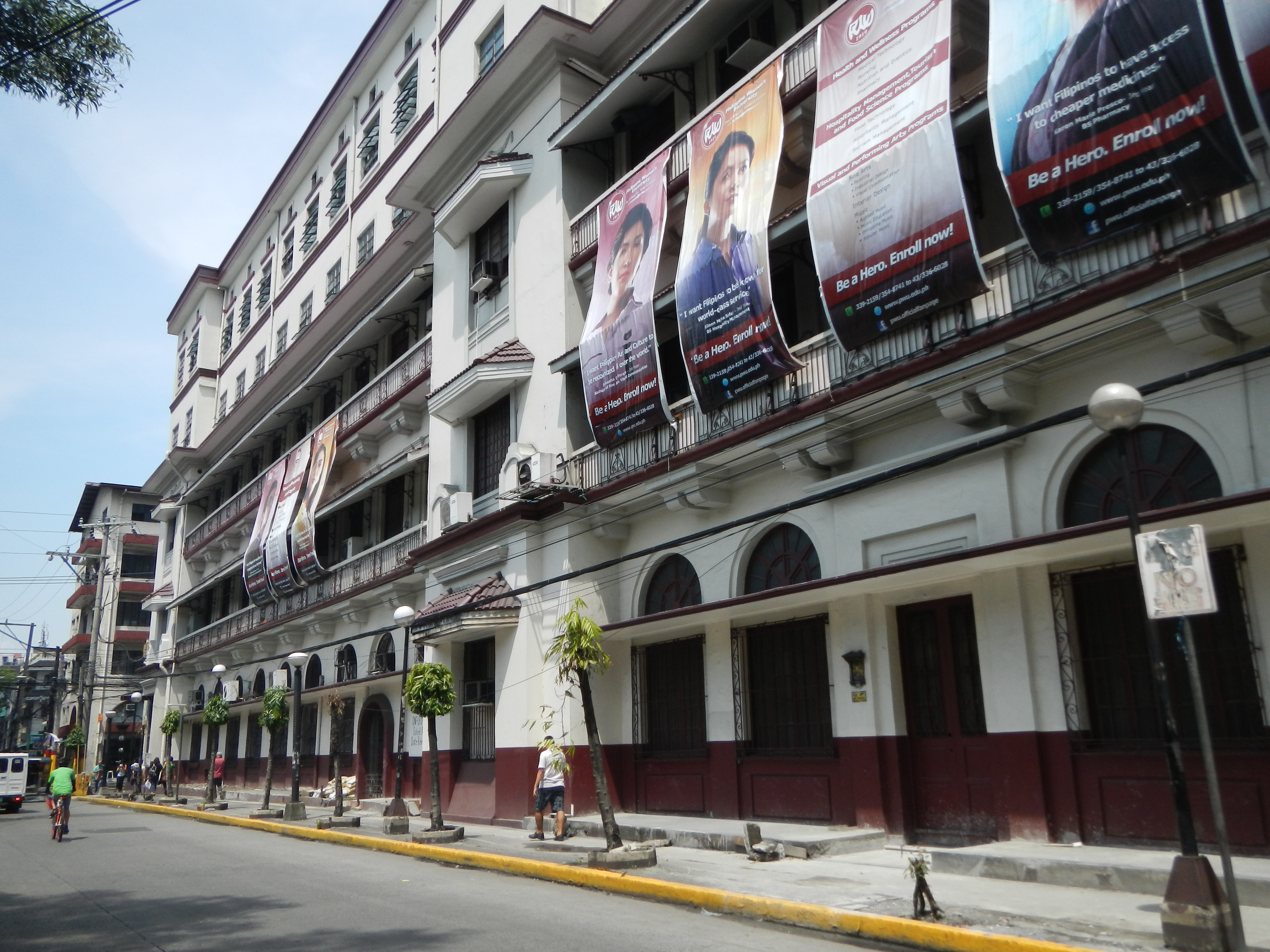
PWU Main Campus facade

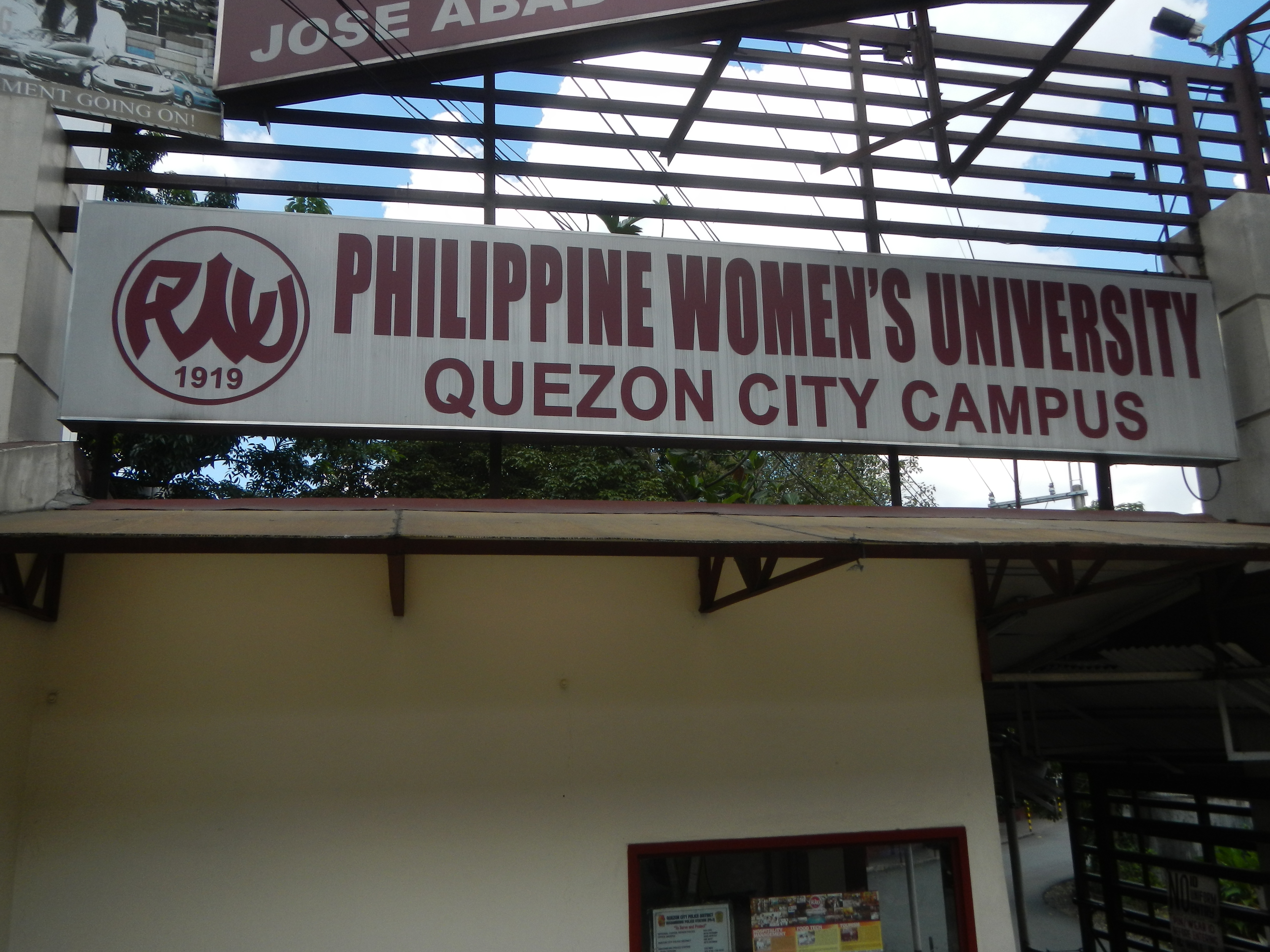
JASMS Quezon City campus

In 2011, PWU was involved in a joint venture plan to infuse much-needed capital from STI, an educational institution owned by Eusebio Tanco. STI stated it assumed debts of PWU, and claimed it prevented an earlier declaration of bankruptcy.

The deal went sour in 2014 and a legal battle ensued when the Benitez family refused to accede to STI's plan to develop a mini-mall and residential condominiums with Ayala Land on the property associated with the PWU JASMS Quezon City campus. STI sought to secure controlling stake over PWU. An amicable settlement was reached by the two parties in 2016 which saw STI stepping down from all involvement with PWU and JASMS in exchange for land owned by the Benitez family, which was used to pay back PWU's debts.

== Notable alumni ==
- Hwang In-youp, South Korean actor, model and singer
- Boy Abunda, television host
- Jason Dy, Singer
- Wilfredo Alicdan, figurative artist
- Teddy Diaz, musician and composer
- Joseph Estrada, actor and politician; former president of the Philippines and Mayor of Manila
- Guia Gomez, politician
- Enya Gonzalez, singer
- Leonor Orosa-Goquingco, National Artist for Dance
- Lucrecia Kasilag, composer and pianist
- Laarni Lozada, singer
- Imelda Marcos, politician and former First Lady; wife of Ferdinand Marcos
- Carmi Martin, actress
- Rosa Santos Munda, lawyer and educator
- Whilce Portacio, comic book writer and artist
- Cory Quirino, television host and author
- Ruffa Gutierrez, actress and Miss World 2nd Princess
- Armida Siguion-Reyna, singer and actress
- Noel Cabangon, singer, composer, and musician
- Jak Roberto, actor
- Marjorie Barretto, actress
- Kaori Oinuma, actress and content creator
- Aljon Mendoza, actor
- Young JV, entertainer
- Margot Pins-Kestenbaum, humanitarian and one of the 1,300 Jewish refugees welcomed by Pres. Manuel L. Quezon

== Outside Metro Manila ==
Davao campus

Less than 50 years since the university's founding, PWU opened similar campuses for women in the country, such as in Iloilo City in the Visayas and Davao City in Mindanao (opened on June 8, 1953, and actively operating as 'Philippine Women's College of Davao' or PWC). In 1972, the Iloilo City Colleges (now the University of Iloilo) purchased the PWC of Iloilo campus in its Jaro District. They turned the buildings into the Don Benito Lopez Memorial Hospital. Fifteen years later, in 1987, Don Benito Lopez Memorial Hospital was acquired by the West Visayas State University. It became the WVSU Hospital, a 150-bed tertiary, teaching and training hospital.

PWU opened a satellite campus in Cebu City but it has since been closed down. It was located at the corner of Leon Kilat and Colon Streets. They also had a satellite campus in Cagayan de Oro, along Antonio Luna Extension, but was later closed and soon renamed "Professional World Academy".

The PWC in Davao City was granted autonomy from PWU and operates under a separate charter as a co-educational institution.

PWU started the Career Development and Continuing Education Center (CDCEC) in 1978 as a means to enable the benefits of a PWU education to reach other areas in the country. There are several CDCEC franchises in Calamba, Sta. Cruz, Baguio, Camarines Norte, Tarlac and Bulacan owned and operated by private individuals and groups.

== Affiliations ==
PWU is a member institution of Philippine Association of College and Universities (PACU), Philippine Accrediting Association of Schools, Colleges and Universities (PAASCU), Philippine Association of Colleges and Universities Commission on Accreditation (PACUCOA) as well as the International Association of Universities and the International Association of University Presidents.

== Sports ==
PWU is active in the Women's National Collegiate Athletics Association (WNCAA) and Women's Collegiate Sports Association (WCSA). The official school moniker is the PWU Patriots.

== See also ==
- Universities and Colleges in the Philippines
