= Colegio de Santa Ana de Victorias =

Roman Catholic college in Negros Occidental, Philippines

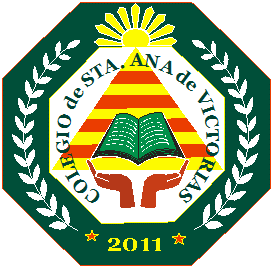
- Motto: "Bringing Quality Education Closer"
- Type: Private basic and higher education institution
- Established: June 2011; 15 years ago
- Founders: Romeo Valenia Santa Ana Sr. Leticia Santa Ana
- Religious affiliation: Roman Catholic
- Academic affiliations: PACUCOA
- President: Romeo Santa Ana, Jr.
- Students: ~2000 (2019)
- Location: Osmeña Avenue – Roxas Street; Victorias, Negros Occidental, Philippines; 10°54′17″N 123°04′30″E
- Campus: Urban
- Patron saints: Saint Anne; Saint Joachim
- Colors: Red, yellow, green
- Nickname: Titans
- Sporting affiliations: NOPSSCEA PRISAA UNIGAMES
- Website: www.colegiodestaanadevictorias.com
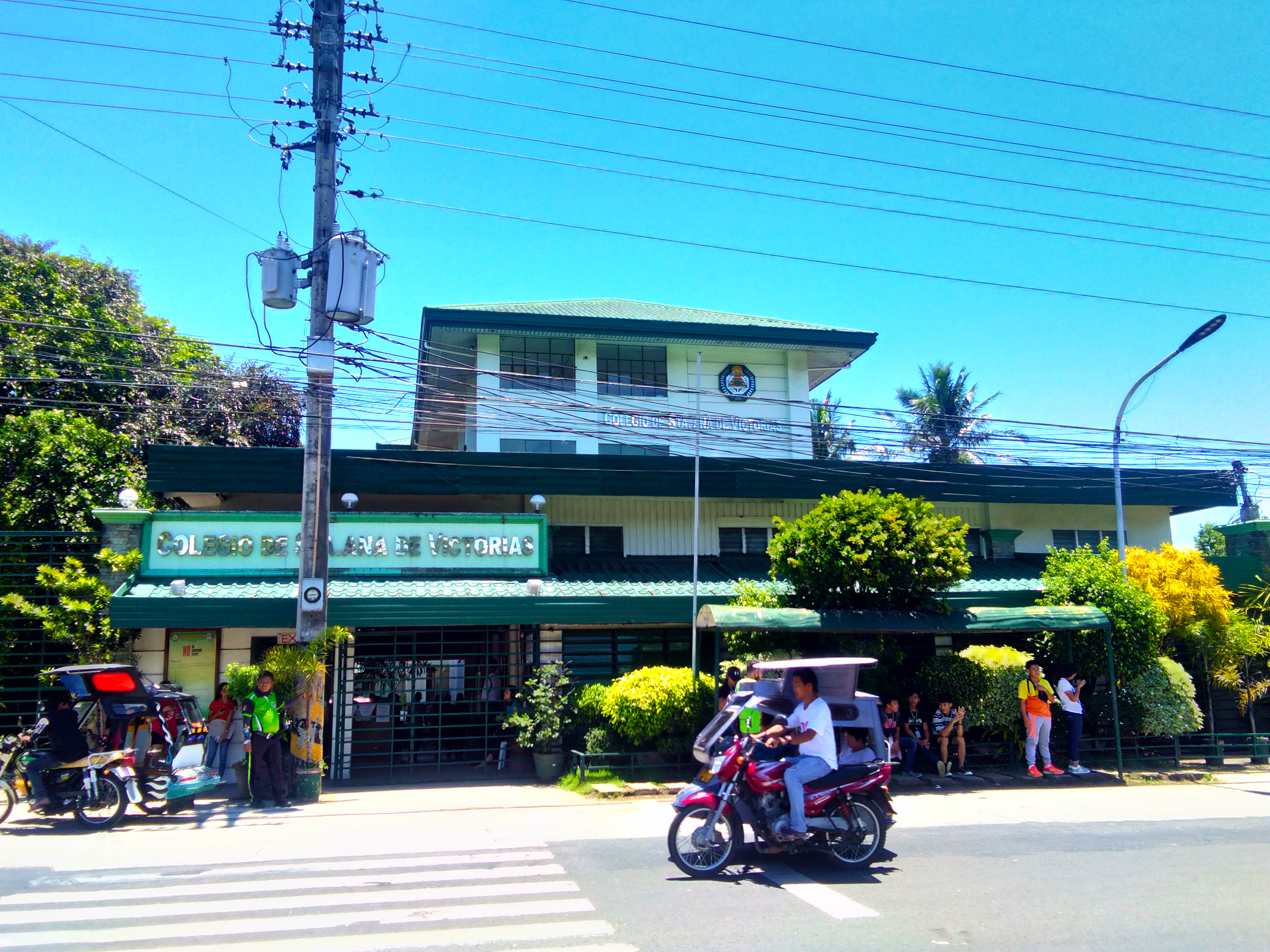

- Location in the Visayas Location in the Philippines

The Colegio de Santa Ana de Victorias (CSAV) is a private Catholic basic and higher education institution located along Osmeña Avenue in Victorias, Negros Occidental, Philippines. The school was established in June 2011 by Romeo Valenia Santa Ana Sr., one of the late altruists of the city. The school offers preschool, primary, secondary (junior and senior high), and college education.

== History ==
The school was founded by the late philanthropist Romeo Valenia Santa Ana Sr., who dreamed of a school that will bring quality education closer to people, especially the young and the marginalized sector in Victorias City and its neighboring towns and cities. Although the Santa Ana patriarch died without seeing his dream materialized, the seed of good intent grew to what is now Colegio de Santa Ana de Victorias.

=== College ===
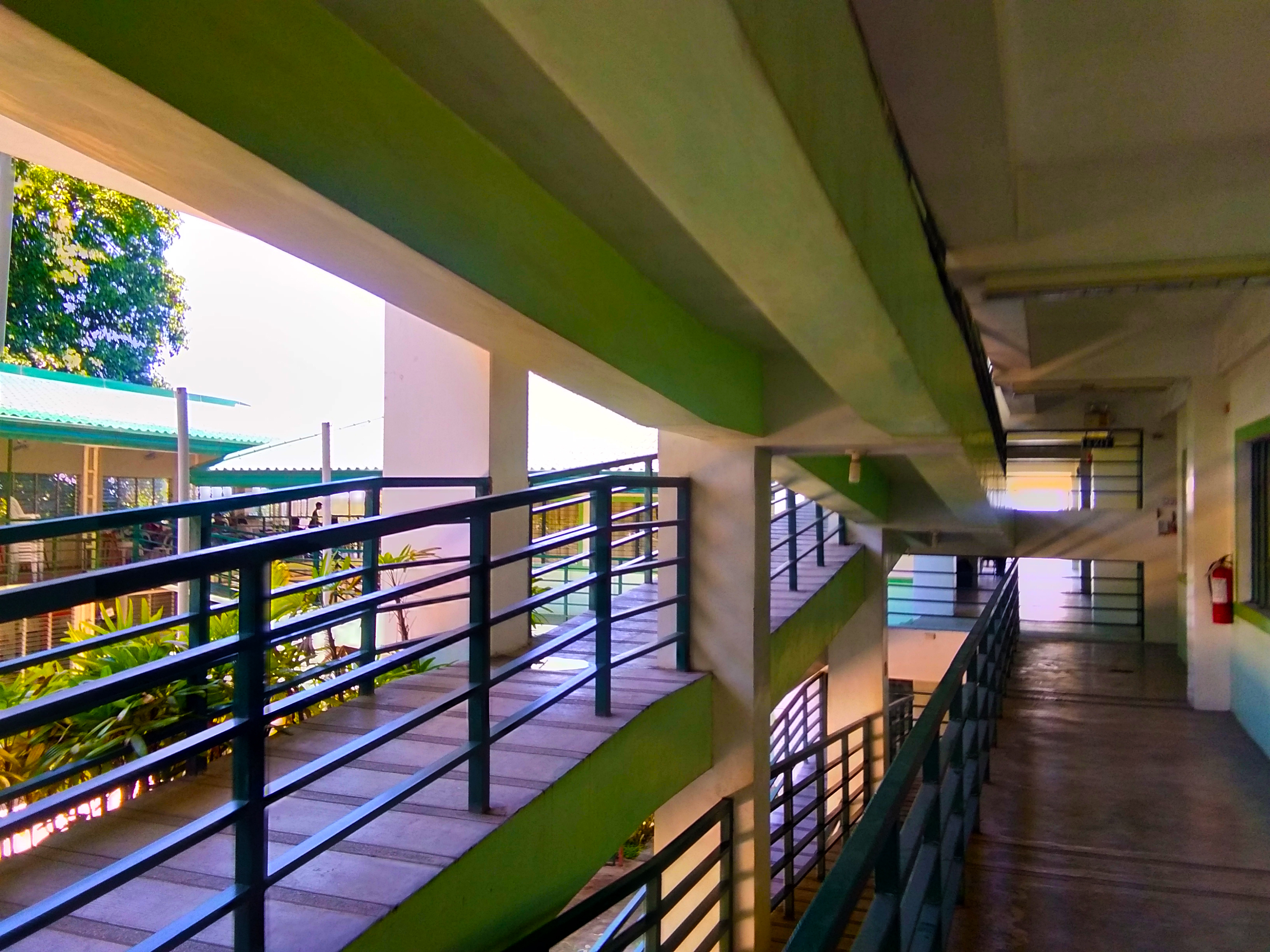
CSAV Hallway

In 2011, the school was established with its first undergraduate program, the Bachelor of Elementary Education with two majors, namely Major in General Education and Major in Early Childhood Education. The school officially opened its classes with 144 enrolled students. Years later, 10 academic courses were added to the undergraduate programs of the college department and some of them are still offered until now.

In 2015, the school launched its official website, produced its first 62 BEED graduates, added one academic program, and has been officially granted by ISO 90001:2008 certification. Years after, PACUCOA granted the school's candidacy status. The school was given the permit by the Bureau of Immigration to accept foreign students, and continues to produce graduates from different academic programs.

=== Integrated School ===
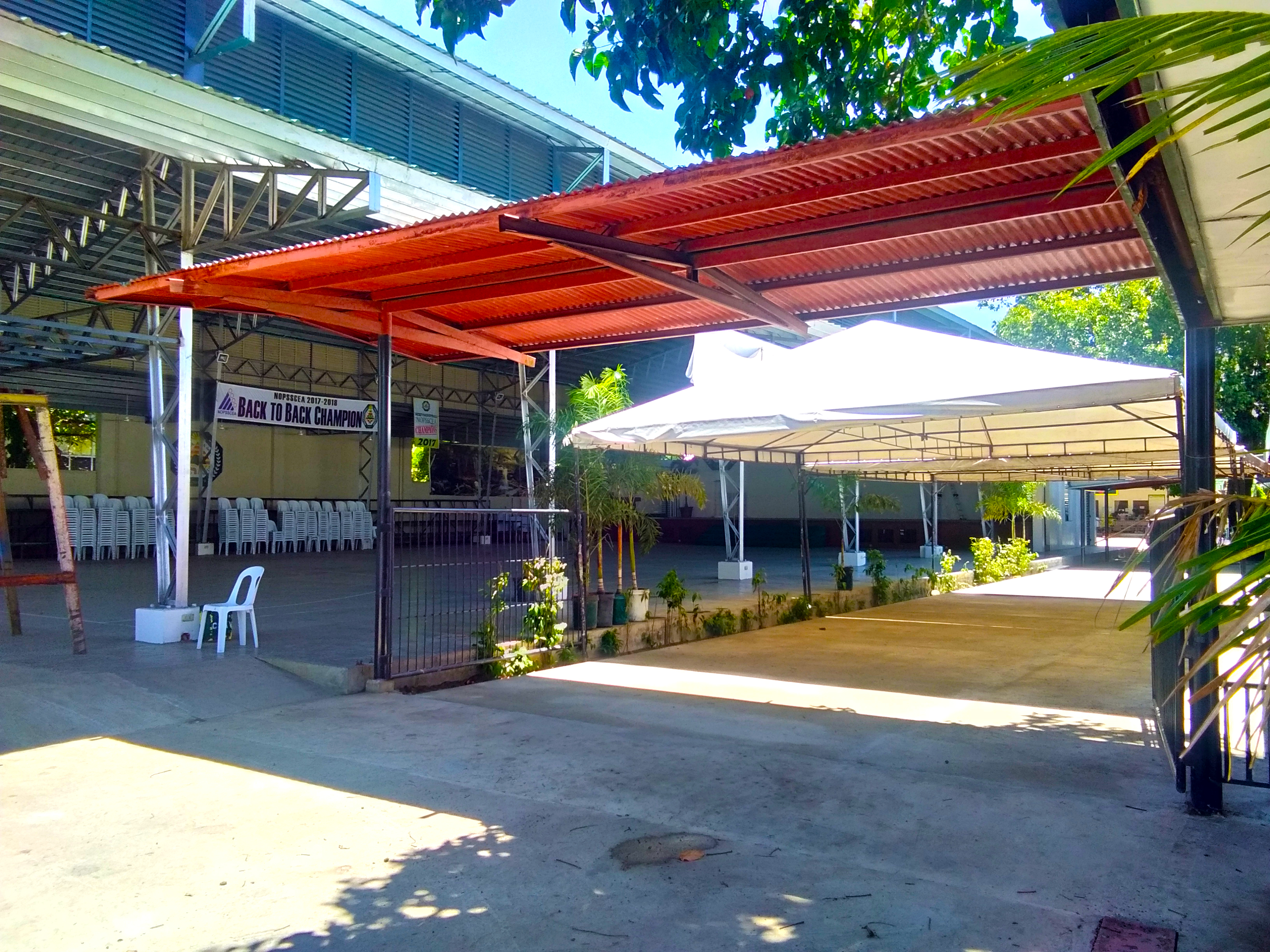
CSAV Hallway

In 2012, an integrated school was established. The school built a two-story building to house its administration office and three classrooms for its Kindergarten, Grade 1 and Grade 7 students; there were only 8 employees and 62 students. After a year, the student's population tripled with 191 students enrolled. This necessitated its movement to a new site to accommodate the growing number of students. The school added grade levels 2, 3, 4 and 8. Also, a three-story building.

In 2014, a covered court and an annex building were built. A year after, the school was granted a Government Recognition by the Department of Education and completed its implementation of all grade levels.

== Patron Saint ==
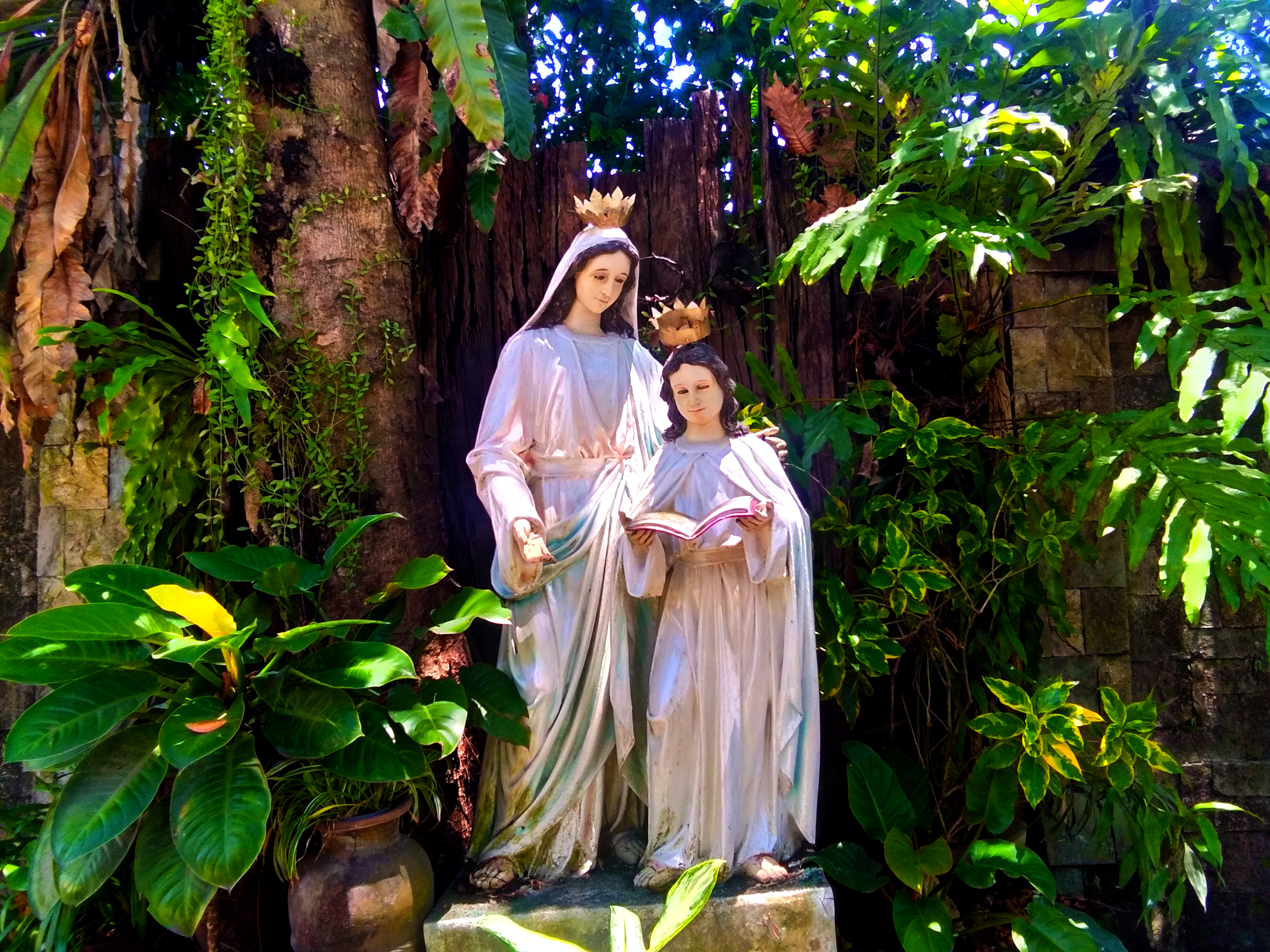
Statue of St. Anne and her daughter Mary.

The school's patron saints are St. Anne and St. Joachim, apocryphally known as the parents of Mary. After the school was established and named Colegio de Santa Ana de Victorias, the school decided to have an official patron saint whose name is the same as the founder's surname Filipino: “Santa Ana” or English: “St. Anne”.

== Academics ==
As well as their 4-year college degree programs, CSAV also offers preschool, elementary, secondary, and undergraduate programs. Their pre-elementary has Kinder 1 and Kinder 2; primary education has Grade 1 – 6; junior high school has Grade 7 – 10 and Senior High School has Grade 11 – 12.

== See also ==
- STI West Negros University
- Don Bosco Technical Institute - Victorias
- Negros Occidental National Science High School
- La Salle College - Victorias
