= Victorias =

Component city in Negros Occidental, Philippines

- Component city
- City of Victorias
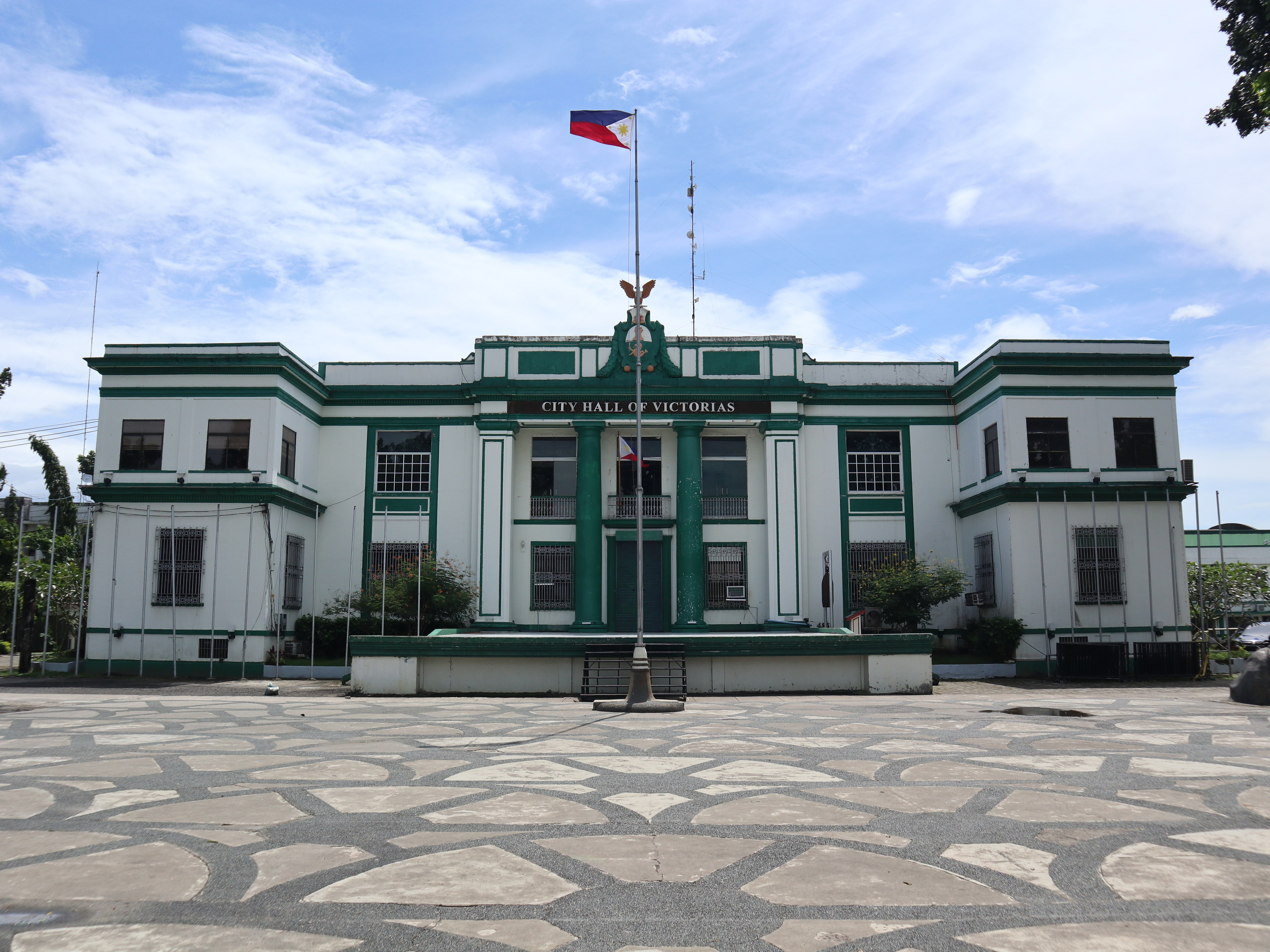
- City hall

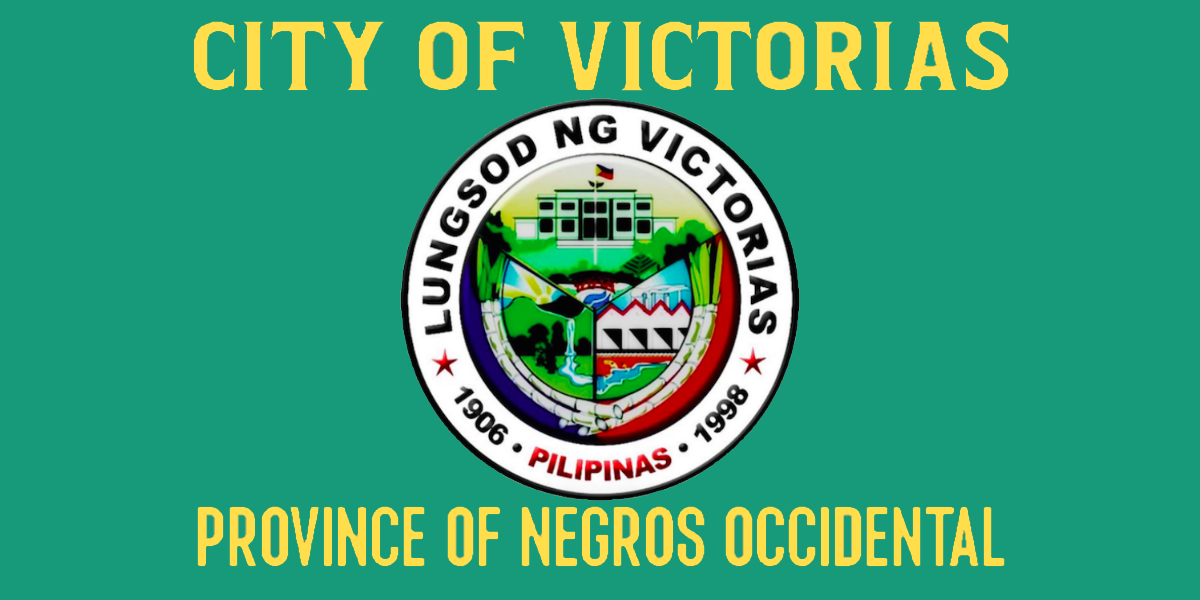
- Flag Seal
- Nicknames: "The Sugarlandia of Negros" "The Sweet and Green City of Negros"
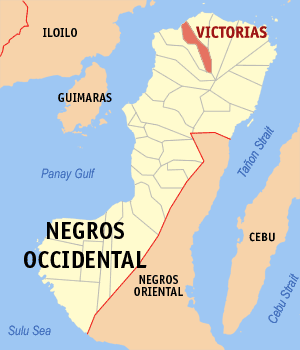
- Map of Negros Occidental with Victorias highlighted
- Interactive map of Victorias
- Location within the Philippines
- Coordinates: 10°54′N 123°05′E
- Country: Philippines
- Region: Negros Island Region
- Province: Negros Occidental
- District: 3rd district
- Founded: October 2, 1906
- Cityhood: March 21, 1998
- Named for: Nuestra Señora de las Victorias (Our Lady of Victory)
- Barangays: 26 (see Barangays)

Government
  - Type: Sangguniang Panlungsod
  - Mayor: Abelardo D. Bantug III (NPC)
  - Vice Mayor: Francis Frederick "Derek" D. Palanca (NPC)
  - Representative: Javier Miguel L. Benitez (PFP)
  - City Council: Members: Warlito T. Undar; Deilen Tornea-Hofileña; Jerry L. Jover; Dexter L. Senido; Dino Jose Maria O. Acuña; Lou Richard V. Cuaycong; Hermie B. Millan; Vincent Marie A. Roa; Joji Adorio-Larraga; Juvy A. Pepello; Trisha Mae C. Majan ^{◌}; ◌ ex officio SK chairman
  - Electorate: 60,576 voters (2025)

Area
  - Total: 133.92 km^{2} (51.71 sq mi)
- Elevation: 166 m (545 ft)
- Highest elevation: 1,568 m (5,144 ft)
- Lowest elevation: 0 m (0 ft)

Population (2024 census)
  - Total: 90,290
  - Density: 674.2/km^{2} (1,746/sq mi)
  - Households: 22,268

Economy
  - Income class: 4th city income class
  - Poverty incidence: 21.33% (2023)
  - Revenue: ₱ 784.4 million (2024)
  - Assets: ₱ 3,409 million (2023, 2024)
  - Expenditure: ₱ 436.4 million (2024)
  - Liabilities: ₱ 1,622 million (2023, 2024)

Service provider
  - Electricity: Northern Negros Electric Cooperative (NONECO)
- Time zone: UTC+8 (PST)
- ZIP code: 6119
- PSGC: 064531000
- IDD : area code: +63 (0)34
- Native languages: Hiligaynon; Tagalog
- Website: www.victoriascity.gov.ph

Victorias, officially the City of Victorias (Hiligaynon: Dakbanwa sang Victorias; Filipino: Lungsod ng Victorias), is a component city in the province of Negros Occidental, Philippines. According to the 2024 census, it has a population of 90,290 people.

Victorias is notable for the St. Joseph the Worker Chapel, which was declared as an Important Cultural Property of the Philippines in December 2015.

It is also the site of Victorias Milling Company, the world's largest integrated sugar mill, sitting on a 7,000 hectares (17,000 acres) compound that makes it the Philippine's largest sugar refinery.

== Geography ==
Victorias is 34 kilometres (21 mi) from Bacolod. It serves as the access point to the Northern Negros Natural Park, popular among hikers visiting Mount Mandalagan and Mount Silay.

=== Barangays ===
Victorias is politically subdivided into 26 barangays. Each barangay consists of puroks and some have sitios.

- Barangay I (Poblacion, Embarcadero, Yap Quiña Subdivision)
- Barangay II (Poblacion, Ubos Tindahan, Tamburong)
- Barangay III (Poblacion, Ubos Simbahan, Sitio Bat-us)
- Barangay IV (Poblacion)
- Barangay V (Poblacion, Ditching Subdivision)
- Barangay VI (Estrella Village, Salvacion)
- Barangay VI-A (Boulevard, Villa Miranda, Sitio Cubay, Pasil)
- Barangay VII (Poblacion, Malinong, Bandung, Dream Village)
- Barangay VIII (Old Simboryo)
- Barangay IX (Daan Banwa)
- Barangay X (Estado)
- Barangay XI (Gawahon)
- Barangay XII (Dacumon)
- Barangay XIII (Gloryville, Terraville, Villa Victorias – commonly 'Yahweh')
- Barangay XIV (Sayding)
- Barangay XV West Caticlan
- Barangay XV-A East Caticlan
- Barangay XVI (Millsite)
- Barangay XVI-A (New Barrio)
- Barangay XVII (Garden)
- Barangay XVIII (Palma)
- Barangay XVIII-A (Golf)
- Barangay XIX (Bacayan)
- Barangay XIX-A (Canetown Subdivision)
- Barangay XX (Cuaycong)
- Barangay XXI (Relocation Site, Takas Patyo)

=== Climate ===
Climate data for Victorias
Month	Jan	Feb	Mar	Apr	May	Jun	Jul	Aug	Sep	Oct	Nov	Dec	Year
Mean daily maximum °C (°F)	28 (82)	29 (84)	30 (86)	32 (90)	32 (90)	31 (88)	30 (86)	29 (84)	29 (84)	29 (84)	29 (84)	28 (82)	30 (85)
Mean daily minimum °C (°F)	23 (73)	23 (73)	23 (73)	24 (75)	25 (77)	25 (77)	25 (77)	24 (75)	24 (75)	24 (75)	24 (75)	23 (73)	24 (75)
Average precipitation mm (inches)	57 (2.2)	37 (1.5)	41 (1.6)	42 (1.7)	98 (3.9)	155 (6.1)	187 (7.4)	162 (6.4)	179 (7.0)	188 (7.4)	114 (4.5)	78 (3.1)	1,338 (52.8)
Average rainy days	12.0	7.7	9.2	10.2	19.5	24.6	26.9	25.1	25.5	25.2	18.0	13.0	216.9
Source: Meteoblue

== Demographics ==
Population census of Victorias
Year	Pop.	±% p.a.
1903	8,372	—
1918	7,557	−0.68%
1939	19,547	+4.63%
1948	27,858	+4.02%
1960	34,290	+1.75%
1970	48,829	+3.59%
1975	53,994	+2.04%
1980	55,959	+0.72%
1990	69,892	+2.25%
1995	78,283	+2.15%
2000	81,743	+0.93%
2007	88,149	+1.05%
2010	88,299	+0.06%
2015	87,933	−0.08%
2020	90,101	+0.51%
2024	90,290	+0.05%
Source: Philippine Statistics Authority

=== Language ===
The people in the city speak Hiligaynon. Tagalog and English are also generally understood.

== Economy ==
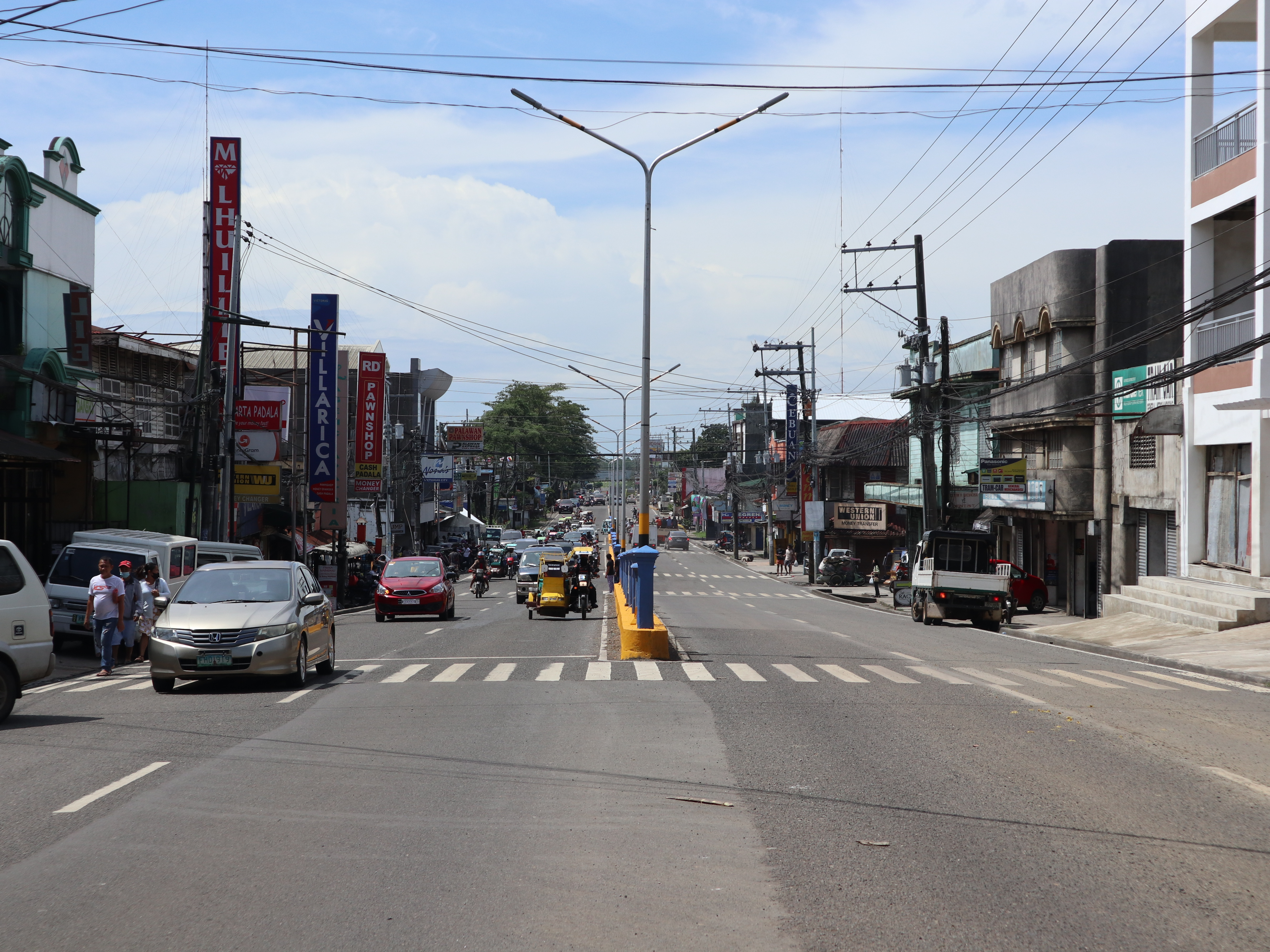
Victorias City main highway.

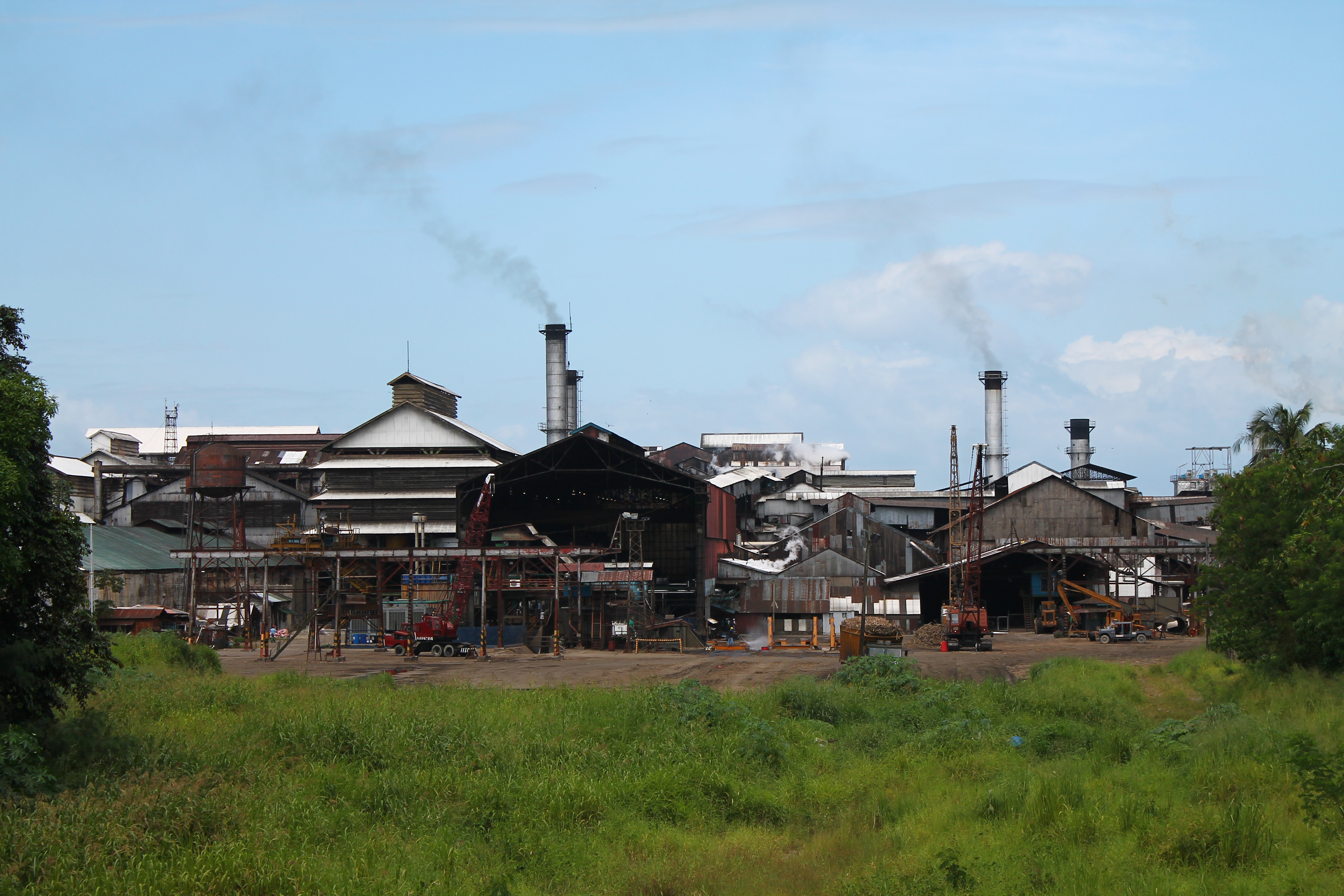
Victorias Milling Co. plant

Poverty incidence of Victorias (%)

Source: Philippine Statistics Authority

== Religion ==
Notable religions include:

- Catholicism
- Philippine Independent Church
- United Pentecostal Church International
- Baptist Bible Fellowship International
- Seventh-day Adventist Church
- The Church of Jesus Christ of Latter-day Saints in the Philippines
- Iglesia ni Cristo
- Jehovah's Witnesses
- Apostolic Pentecostalism
- Evangelical Protestantism
- IKTHUS

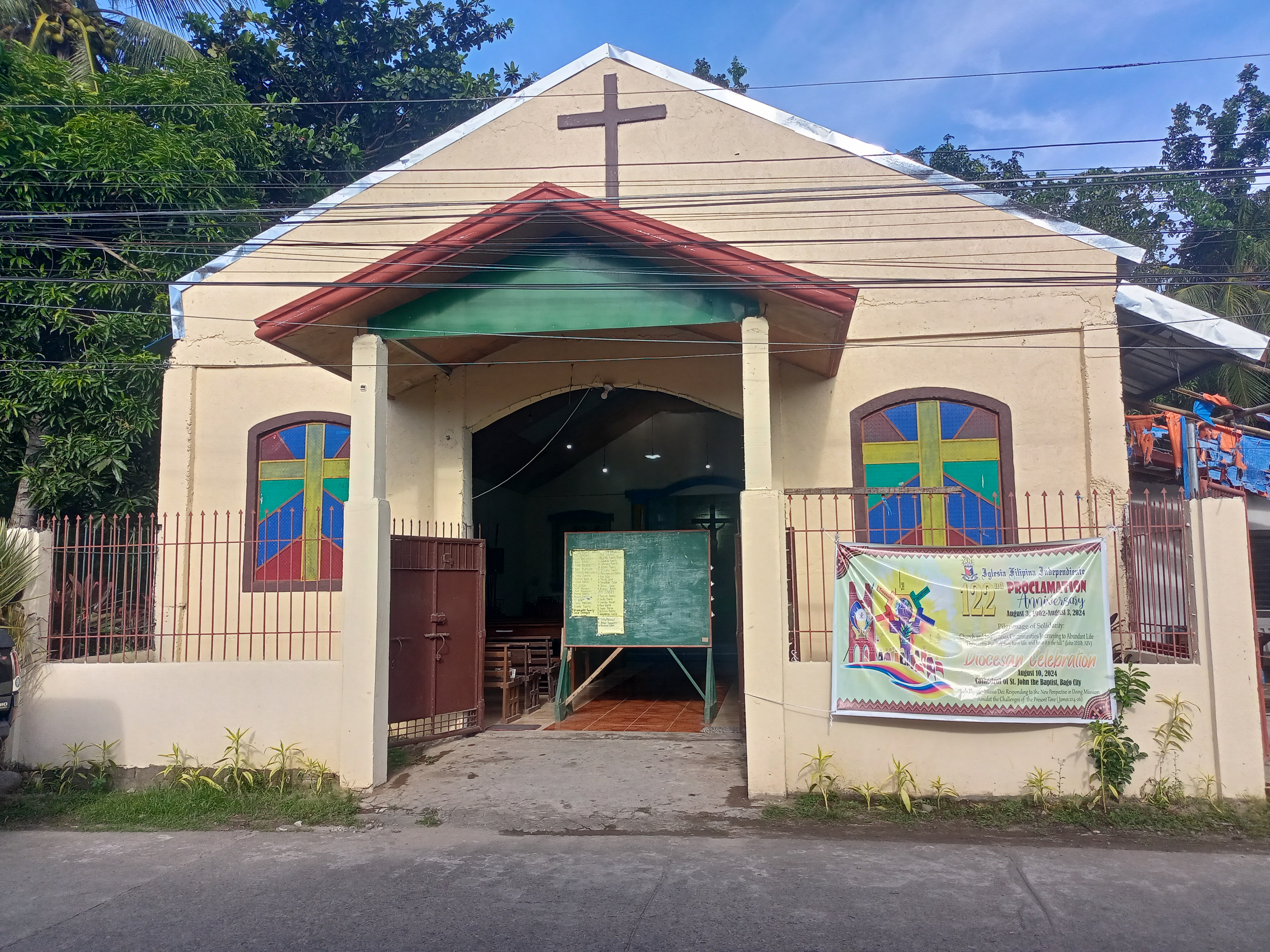
Iglesia Filipina Independiente (IFI) Mission Church of St. Andrew the Apostle in Brgy. Daan Banwa.

=== Churches ===
Notable churches include:

Roman Catholic

- St. Joseph the Worker Chapel, also known as the Angry Christ Church
- Mary Help of Christians Church (locally called 'cathedral' because of its gigantic structure despite not housing a cathedra — the bishop's seat)
- Our Lady of Victory Parish Church
- Our Lady of Guadalupe Quasi-Parish Church
- Saint Padre Pio Chapel – Nordson
- San Roque Parish Church (Daan Banwa)

Other Denominations

- IFI Mission Church of St. Andrew the Apostle
- The Church of Jesus Christ of Latter-day Saints Victorias City
- Iglesia Ni Cristo - Locale Congregation of Victorias City

=== Cemeteries ===
Notable cemeteries:

- Jarden Sang Aton Mga Pinalangga Sa Kabuhi (Victorias Public Cemetery)
- Victorias Memorial Park
- St. Joseph Memorial Garden
- Victorias City People's Memorial Park

=== St. Joseph the Worker Chapel ===
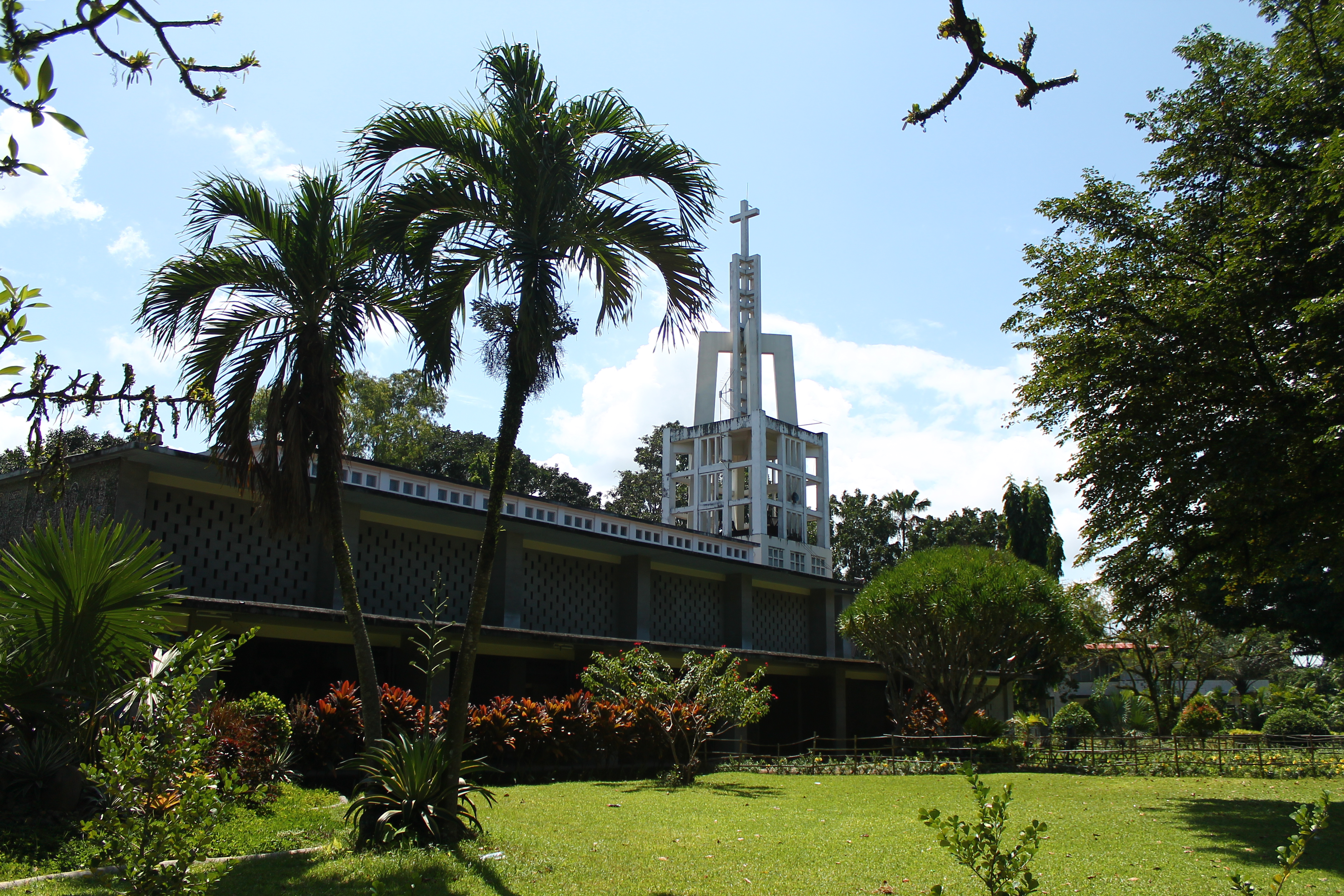
St. Joseph the Worker Chapel.

Within the Victorias Milling Company's complex is the St. Joseph the Worker Chapel, a masterpiece considered the first example of modern sacral architecture in the Philippines and raised to the status of Important Cultural Property by the National Museum of the Philippines in 2015. The chapel was designed by the famous Czech Architect Antonín Raymond.

Its mural of the Angry Christ was painted by international artist Alfonso Ossorio. The mural has been featured in various publications such as Life Magazine. Its fierce, vivid colors gave the church its most known name, the "Angry Christ Church".

== Festivals ==
The city celebrates the annual Kadalag-an Festival, a charter anniversary held on March 21, and the annual Malihaw Festival on April 26.

The city also celebrates the Kalamayan Festival every December. The word "Kalamayan" depicts what Victorias is known for, its “kalamay” or refined sugar and its sugar industry, the Victorias Milling Company.

Barangay Festivals

Considerations:

1. Some barangay festivals are unnamed.

2a. Barangays with asterisk (*) are further subdivided to smaller haciendas, sitios, or villages, etc. that celebrate their own festivals. These are not enumerated below.

2b. However, a barangay with asterisk that has an enlisted festival and/or date means that its Local Government Unit (LGU) organizes a principal festival.

• Barangay I* – Pasalamat Festival (last weekend of May)
• Barangay II – Ratsada Festival (last Saturday of June)
• Barangay III*
• Barangay IV – Patronal Fiesta of Our Lady of Lourdes (February 11)
• Barangay V
• Barangay VI*
• Barangay VI-A* – Baybayanon Festival (last weekend of June)
• Barangay VII* – Ati-atihan Festival (last Saturday of May)
• Barangay VIII* – Simboryo Festival (last Saturday of October)
• Barangay IX – Guintunaan Festival (August 30)
• Barangay X* — Patronal Fiesta of Our Lady of Guadalupe (December 12)
• Barangay XI*
• Barangay XII*
• Barangay XIII* – Hilinugyaw Festival
• Barangay XIV* – San Juan Festival (June 24)
• Barangay XV (December 21)
• Barangay XV-A*
• Barangay XVI*
• Barangay XVI-A*
• Barangay XVII*
• Barangay XVIII*
• Barangay XVIII-A* – May Flower Festival
• Barangay XIX* – Patronal Fiesta of Saint Joseph (March 19)
• Barangay XIX-A* – Patronal Solemnity of the Immaculate Conception (December 8)
• Barangay XX* – Kasadyahan Festival (May 30)
• Barangay XXI – Tigkalalag Festival (first weekend of November)

== Notable personalities ==
- Noven Belleza - first champion of Tawag ng Tanghalan; born in Victorias
- Albee Benitez - Member of the House of Representatives of the Philippines, 43rd Mayor of Bacolod,CEO and Chairman Brightlight Productions
- Javi Benitez - Mayor of Victorias , Member of the House of Representatives of the Philippines
- Jose Francisco Benitez - Member of the House of Representatives of the Philippines, Director General of the Technical Education and Skills Development Authority (TESDA)
- Romy Pastrana — comedian and Goin' Bulilit member under the name Dagul.
- Alexandra Eala - Ranked World no. 20 in the Women’s Tennis Association, 2022 US Open (tennis) Junior Women’s Singles Champion
- Franz Ontal - Head of inspector training at the Organisation for the Prohibition of Chemical Weapons (OPCW), he was serving in this capacity when the organization won the 2013 Nobel Peace Prize
- Alfonso A. Ossorio — abstract expressionist artist, many of his art is held in the permanent collections of major institutions like the Museum of Modern Art, and the Whitney Museum of American Art, both of which are in New York City, and the Smithsonian American Art Museum in Washington DC. His most famous work, the Angry Christ Mural is a midcentury modern and cultural landmark in the Philippines and has been featured in international publications Life Magazine and National Geographic

== Education ==
Notable educational institutions include:

Higher Education and Private Schools

- Central Philippines State University – Victorias City Campus
- La Salle College–Victorias
- Colegio de Santa Ana de Victorias
- Laura Vicuña Women Development and Training Center (Hacienda Malihao, Barangay XX)
- Don Bosco Technical Institute, Victorias
- Colegio de Santa Ana de Victorias – Integrated School

Schools Division of Victorias (Public Schools)

- Negros Occidental National Science High School
- Victorias National High School
- Abelardo D.L. Bantug, Sr. National High School (Hacienda Amanda, Barangay VIII)
- Victorias City Farm School (Hacienda Cuaycong, Barangay XX)
- Barangay Estado National High School (Estado, Barangay X)
- Gawahon Integrated School (Barangay XI)
- Victorias Elementary School
- Villa Victorias Elementary School

Historically and culturally notable schools that have been abolished (as of 2026):

- Don Felix Montinola Memorial College
- Jack and Jills Schools / Castleson High

Notable libraries within the city:

- Victorias City Public Library
- Library of Colegio de Santa Ana de Victorias
- Library of Victorias Elementary School
