= St. Joseph the Worker Chapel, Victorias =

Roman Catholic church in Negros Occidental, Philippines

Saint Joseph the Worker Parish Church
- Angry Christ Church
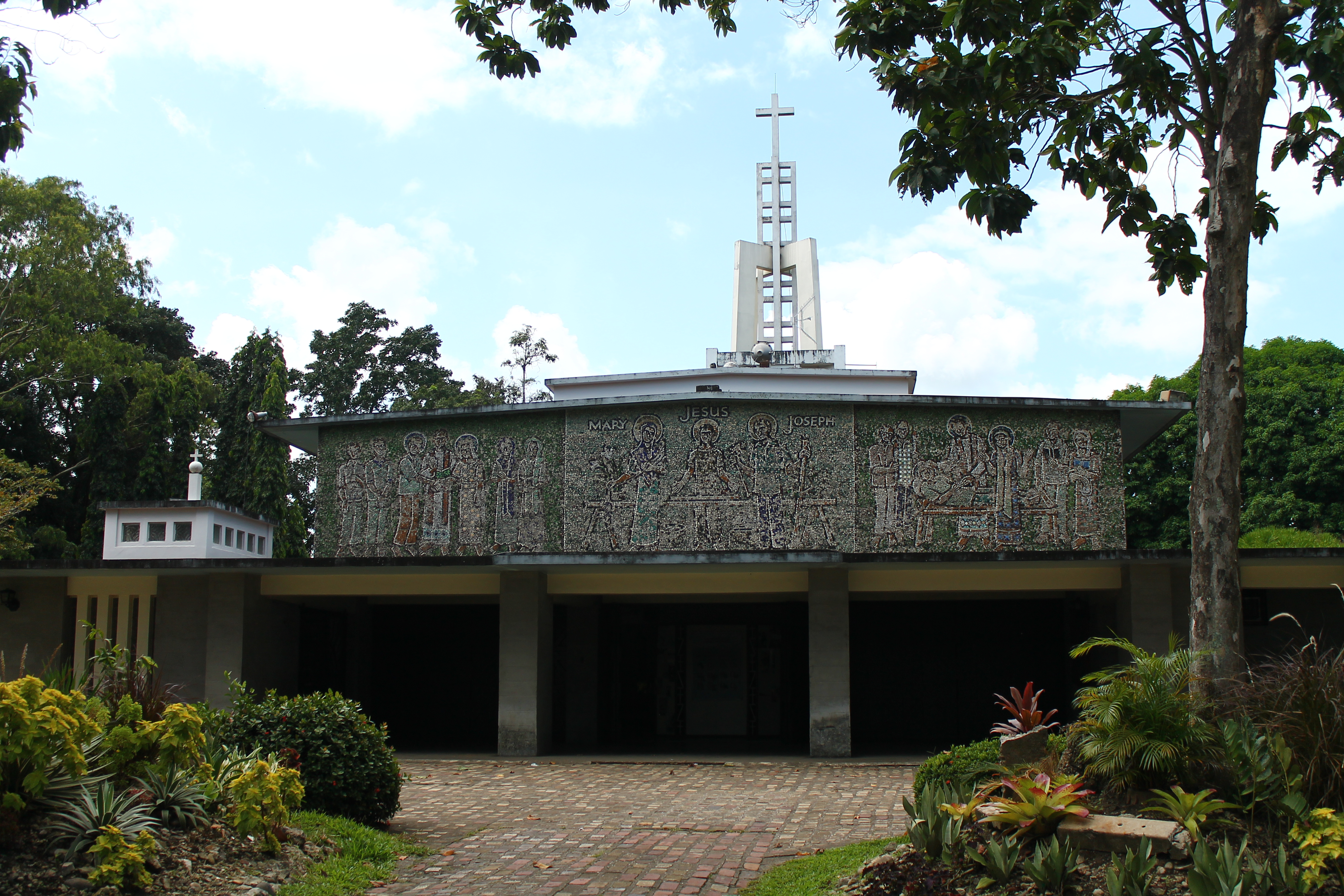
- Church facade in 2013

- Location in the Visayas Location in the Philippines
- 10°52′44″N 123°03′59″E
- Location: Victorias Milling Company complex, Victorias, Negros Occidental
- Country: Philippines
- Denomination: Roman Catholic

History
- Dedication: St. Joseph the Worker
- Dedicated: 1950

Architecture
- Functional status: active
- Heritage designation: Important Cultural Property
- Designated: 2015
- Architect: Antonín Raymond
- Architectural type: Church (building)
- Style: Modern
- Years built: 1948-50

Administration
- Archdiocese: Jaro
- Diocese: Bacolod

Saint Joseph the Worker Parish Church, commonly known as the Angry Christ Church, is a Roman Catholic church located inside the Victorias Milling Company residential complex in Victorias City, Negros Occidental, Philippines. It is considered as the first example of modern sacred architecture in the Philippines as well as part of its industrial heritage. The church is under the jurisdiction of the Diocese of Bacolod and is dedicated to St. Joseph the Worker.

The church was designed by the Czech-American architect Antonín Raymond, himself already recognized as one of the founders of modern architecture in Japan. Raymond designed the church to be earthquake-proof since the Philippines is in an earthquake belt. The St. Joseph the Worker Church is made up of two sections, the nave and the tower. They are connected by movable beams holding the building up well even during earthquakes. Raymond also took into consideration the climate in the Philippine thus he designed the structure to allow maximum air circulation in the hot and humid climate. The church was declared Important Cultural Property of the Philippines in December 2015.

The church is also known for its modern altar painting of so-called "Angry Christ" painted in vivid colors by Alfonso Ossorio, Filipino-American abstract expressionist artist.

== History ==
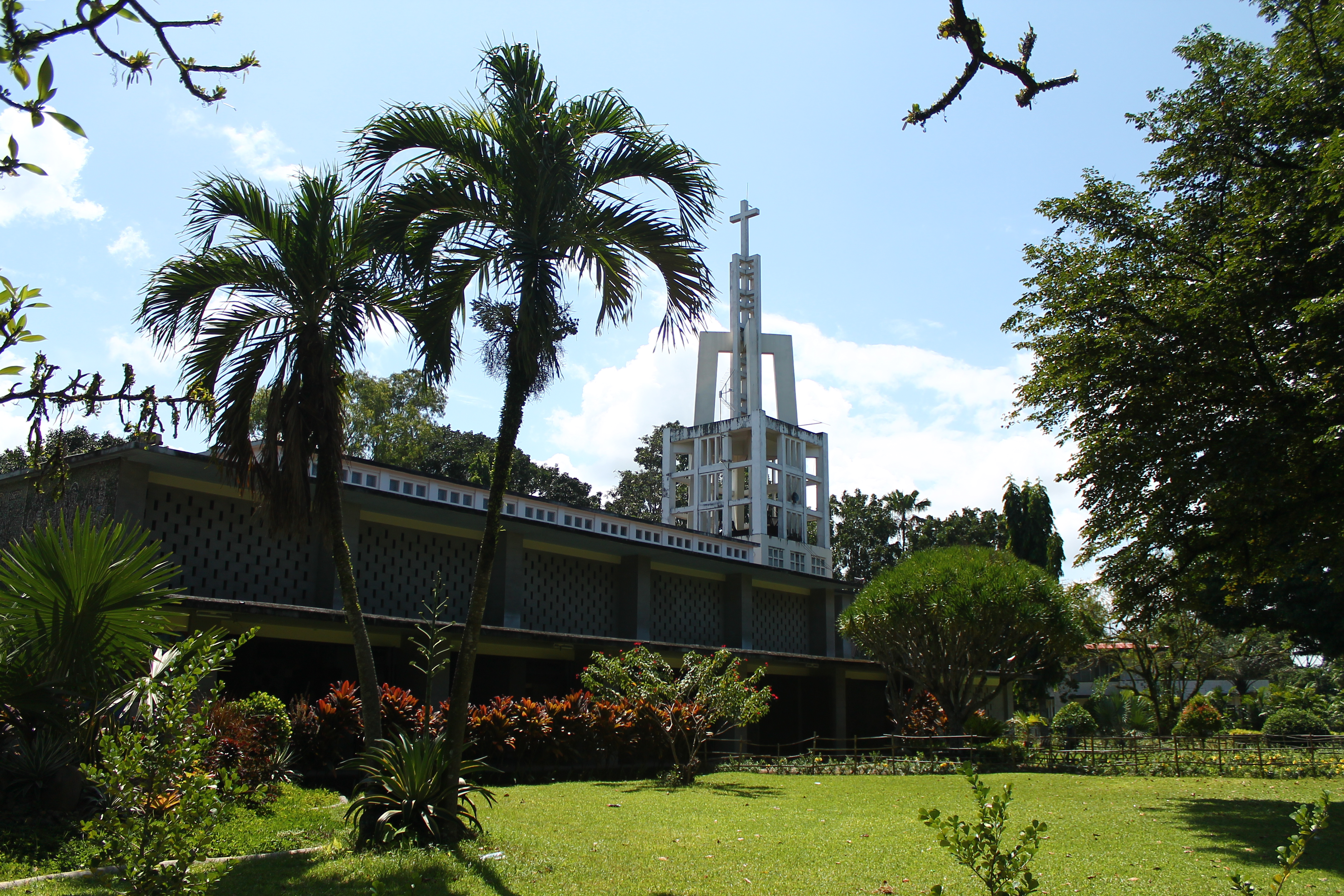
The church in 2013

It was built between 1948 and 1950 by the Ossorio family thus it is sometimes called the Ossorio's Chapel The Ossorios originally planned to offer the job to the then young Filipino architect Leandro Locsin, but later changed their mind and selected then-already internationally acclaimed Antonín Raymond. Raymond then had designed buildings in the United States, Japan, India, Indonesia and other Asian countries. This event caused Locsin to change his style to more modern architecture, which made him famous later.

== Art in the church ==
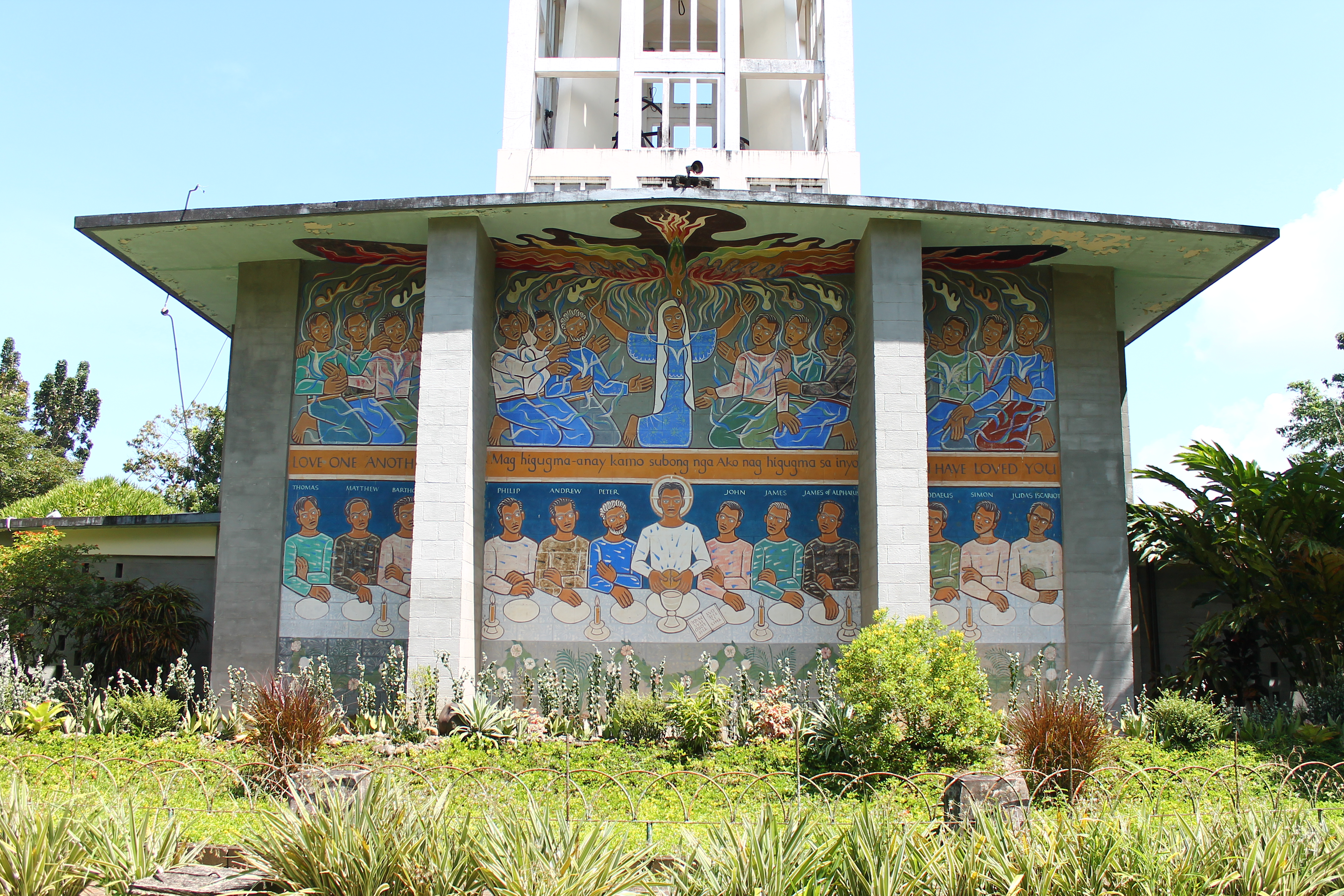
Mural on the rear wall

The church sanctuary, devoid of any reredos, is dominated by a vibrant-colored mural of a large Masonic eye and an angry-looking Jesus commonly called "The Angry Christ". The mural was painted by Philippine-born Alfonso Ossorio, friend of Jackson Pollock and Clyfford Still. Mosaics are by the Belgian Adelaide de Bethune. The materials and talents were provided by the local artists Arcadio Anore and Benjamin Valenciano. Arcadio Anore executed Bethune's designs for the brass plates in the pulpit and baptistery while Benjamin Valenciano did the wooden image sculptures inside the church including the images for the Stations of the Cross. Their works were recognized by the Philippine religious arts for introducing a "Filipinized" version of religious themes depicting Mary, Joseph and the characters in the Fourteen Stations of the Cross to have brown skin in traditional Filipino attire.
