= Victorias Milling =

Philippine sugar manufacturing company

Victorias Milling Company
- Company type: Public
- Traded as: PSE: VMC
- Industry: Industrial; Food, Beverage & Tobacco
- Founded: May 7, 1919; 107 years ago
- Founder: Don Miguel Ossorio
- Headquarters: Victorias City, Philippines
- Area served: Worldwide
- Revenue: ▼ ₱6.618 billion (2018)
- Net income: ▲₱1.088 billion (2018)
- Total assets: ▲₱9,535 billion (2018)
- Total equity: ▲ ₱6,688 billion (2018)
- Subsidiaries: Victorias Green Energy Corporation; Canetown Development Corporation; Victorias Foods Corporation; Victorias Golf and Country Club, Inc. Victorias Quality Packaging Company, Inc. Victorias Industrial Gases Corporation Victorias Agricultural Land Corporation
- Website: victoriasmilling.com

Victorias Milling Company (PSE: VMC) is a publicly listed company in the Philippines that was established in 1919. It is largest producer of sugar in the country and one of the largest sugar millers and refineries in Asia. Its core business is the production of integrated raw and refined sugar and engaging in engineering services. Trading on the Philippine Stock Exchange (PSE), the company is in Victorias City, Negros Occidental, Philippines where its plant facilities are also located.

== History ==
=== Early years ===
Victorias Milling Company (VMC), considered the Philippines' leading sugar firm and the largest sugar producer, was founded by Don Miguel Ossorio together with wife Maria Paz Yangco, Claudio Ruiz de Luzuriaga, his brother Francisco Ossorio, and Shiras Jones. Its mill and refinery facilities for sugar and allied products are in Victorias City, Negros Occidental.

Established on May 7, 1919, it is one of the earliest sugar mills established in the Philippines. Two years earlier, Ossorio founded the North Negros Sugar Company, a 300-TCD (ton of cane per day) centrifugal mill in Manapla, Negros Occidental, where the sugar planters from Victorias milled their produce. VMC was bigger at a capacity of 1,500 TCD when it started operations in 1921, and both companies were merged after World War II. Equipment and machinery in Manapla were utilized to repair the site in Victorias which was heavily damaged, and a sugar refinery was constructed with a capacity of almost a million pounds of sugar per year.

The Spanish-descent Ossorio was the president and chairman from the start until 1967. He invited his wife Paz, his brother Francisco, entrepreneurs Jones and Claudio R. de Luzurriaga, Sr. as partners. Later in 1921, the chemist Carlos Locsin of Silay City joined the management team. The following became president of the company: Jose Maria Ossorio, Miguel Ossorio's son (1967–1976; chairman emeritus until 1989); Claudio Luzurriaga Jr., Claudio de Luzurriga's son (1976–1991); Gerardo Javellana (1991–1997); Manuel Mañalac (1997–??). The company grew to become one of the largest integrated raw and refined sugar manufacturer in Asia and produced half of the country's demand for refined sugar. It successfully raised P525 million from its initial public offering in September 1993.

=== Asian financial crisis ===
During the Asian financial crisis, it sought debt relief during its bankruptcy in 1995. Accounting issues were uncovered on the use of loan sugar quedans that could not be accounted for. Its dire financial situation was attributed to the competition brought about by cheap imported sugar, not operating to full capacity, loans that were spent for facility repairs and ventures to other industries, and trading extension of its subsidiary, the North Negros Marketing Corporation.

In March 1997, the company sought and was approved for a 90-day moratorium on principal payments on its loans from 32 creditors. The company's shares were also suspended from the public negotiations in the local bourse on that year due to its failure in filing the required documentation and fees, as well as concerns on material information of the company's disclosures. The local bourse issued a warning to de-list the company in 1999.

The board replaced Gerardo B. Javellana with Manuel Mañalac as president in June 1997. By July, it requested the SEC to suspend further debt payments and to establish a committee to oversee the company's management and to come up with a rehabilitation plan, which involved selling common shares, reducing debt such as converting debts to equity, reducing the workforce, and adding new business partners. Isidro Alcantara Jr., then vice president of PCIBank, was appointed by SEC as the committee head on the rehabilitation plan's implementation.

=== In the 2000s ===
The company established a creditor-driven program to improve its financial standing and to settle the maturity of obligations earlier than schedule. By May 31, 2013, it has turned around its operations by settling P4.4 billion restructured loans and by redeeming issued convertible notes. By December 16, 2013, it has converted P70.5 million in notes to 70,049,966 shares.

In 2018, VMC sought SEC's approval to modify the rehabilitation plan to add loans worth P1.19 billion that were the subject of litigation with creditors. The loans consisted of refined sugar delivery orders (RSDO) and quedans (RSQ) that were allegedly issued by the company and then utilized by its subsidiary, the North Negros Marketing Co. Inc. (Nonemarco), to facilitate borrowing. These loans were previously not part of the rehabilitation program, were up for resolution in the court, and according to the company, "lacked any factual or legal basis and that the officers who issued them acted fraudulently.”

By December 2018, VMC again proposed to amend the rehabilitation plan to include compromise payment scheme on some of its loans. Asserting that it didn't benefit from the proceeds of the loans, the company agreed to debt settlements spread over 10 years to prevent "future and protracted litigation."

=== Stock trading ===
Filipino businessman Lucio Tan, who gave a critical lifeline in the midst of the Asian crisis, owned a 30.9% stake, while the public owned 24% of its stock. When VMC stocks were opened for trading in 2012, its price rose by 931%. Its share was valued at P0.29 when it was last traded on October 8, 1997, and it closed at P2.99 on May 21, 2012.

== Subsidiaries ==
On July 3, 2013, the SEC approved the company to engage into other industries aside from manufacturing sugar and allied products and engaging in engineering services. The forerunners of its subsidiaries were established much earlier. For instance, the company's foundry division began in 1964, agribusiness in 1976, management and technical services group in 1977, and food processing division in 1979. The company's subsidiaries include Victorias Foods Corporation which is into sardines and meat products, Victorias Agricultural Land Corporation, Victorias Green Energy Corporation, Canetown Development Corporation, the 65-hectare Victorias Golf and Country Club, Inc., Victorias Quality Packaging Company, Inc., and Victorias Industrial Gases Corporation. In addition, the company also owns other facilities including farms, piggery, a 180-kilometer railway system, a school, a shipping company and the Saint Joseph Hospital.

== Impact ==
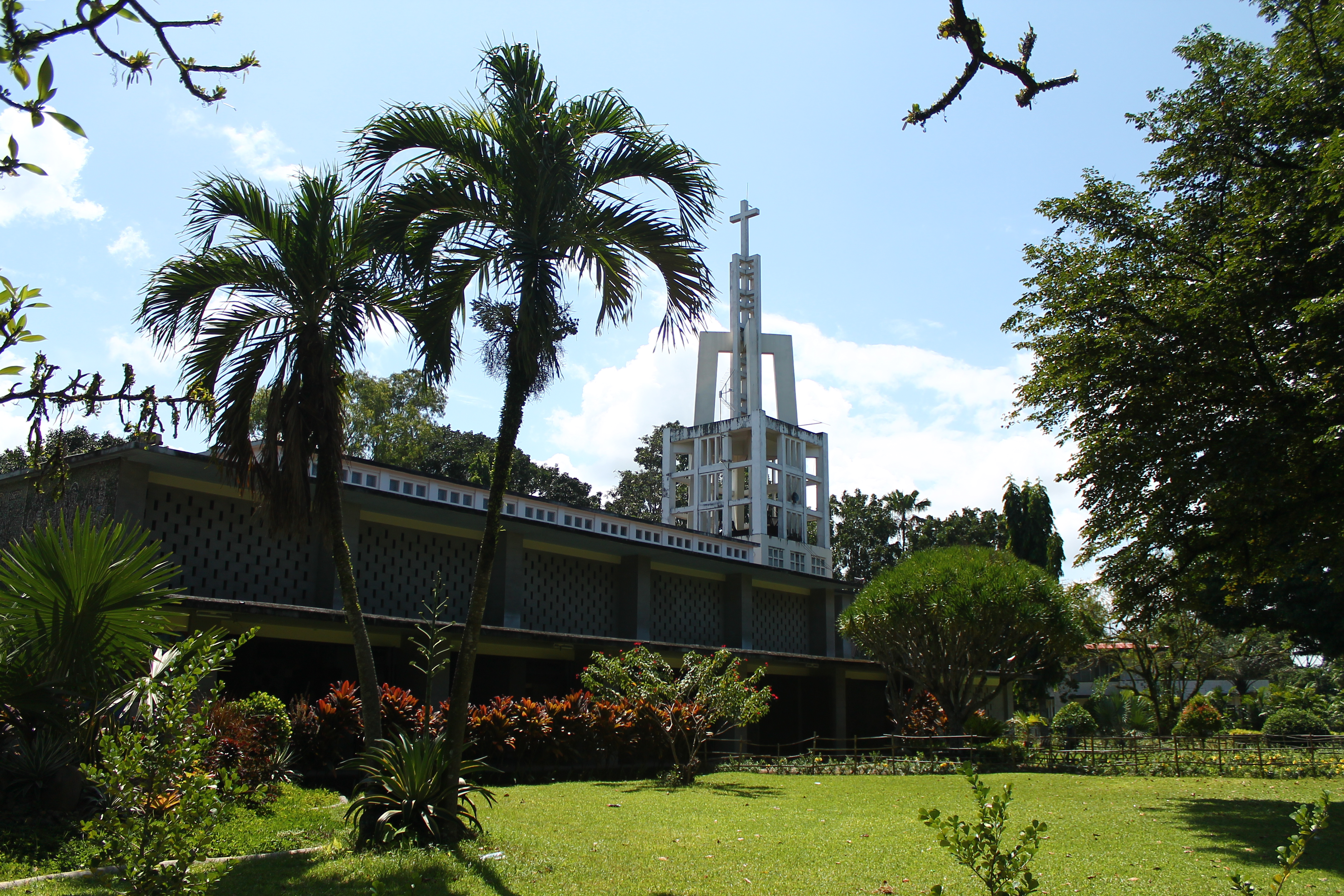
St. Joseph the Worker Chapel.

The company, due to its ownership of lands and its various enterprises, had influence in the locality particularly in Victorias. Its businesses contributed to the promotion of the municipality to a city, which according to scholar Cesar Saldaña, was "the city that sugar built." The name of its annual Kalamayan Festival that started in 2014, which the city celebrates every December, comes from the Cebuano word kalamay (sugar) owing to the importance of this commodity to the economy and to the province of Negros Occidental.

Upon celebrating 100 years since it was established, the company signed a memorandum of agreement with Philippine Postal Corporation to release a commemorative stamp that would contain the company's centennial anniversary logo. Since 2013, the company holds an annual art competition for grade school and high school students.

Moreover, the renowned St. Joseph the Worker Chapel is located in VMC compound. It is considered one of masterpieces in modern Philippine church art and architecture, and it is part of the National Museum's Important Cultural Properties.
