= Conrado Benitez =

Filipino statesman, writer, and educator

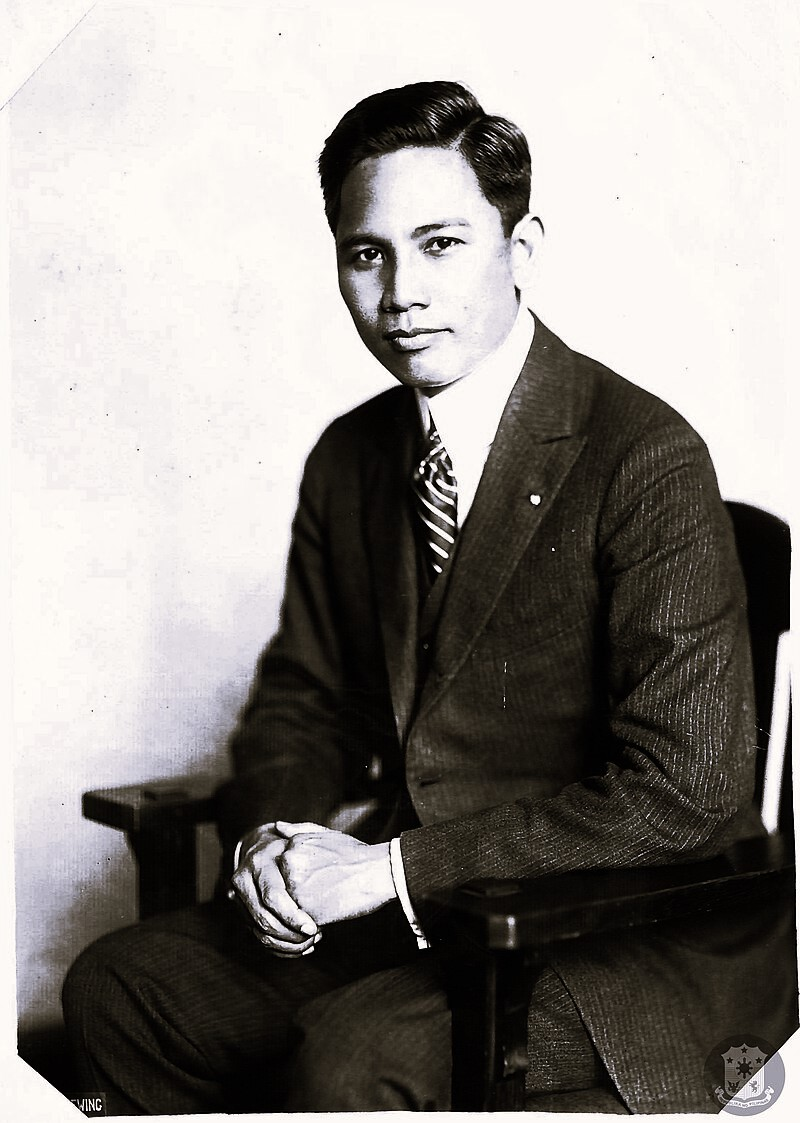
- Born: 26 November 1889; Pagsanjan, Laguna, Captaincy General of the Philippines
- Died: 4 January 1971 (aged 81); Manila, Philippines
- Occupations: Writer, educator
- Spouse: Francisca Tirona
- Children: 4, including Helena
- Parent(s): Higinio Benítez; Soledad Francia
- Relatives: Albee Benitez (great-grandson); Jose Francisco Benitez (great-grandson); Javi Benitez (great-great-grandson); Marielle Javellana (great-granddaughter)

Conrado Francia Benitez (November 26, 1889 – January 4, 1971) was a Filipino statesman, writer, and educator. He founded the Philippine Rural Reconstruction Movement and was one of the drafters of the 1935 Constitution of the Philippines.

== Early life and education ==
Benitez was born on November 26, 1889, in Pagsanjan, Laguna. He studied at the Philippine Normal School and graduated valedictorian. In 1911, he was sent to the United States as a government pensionado and enrolled at the University of Chicago where he acquired his M.A, and his Ph.D. Back in the Philippines, he studied law at the University of the Philippines. He was a member of the Upsilon Sigma Phi fraternity.

== Career ==
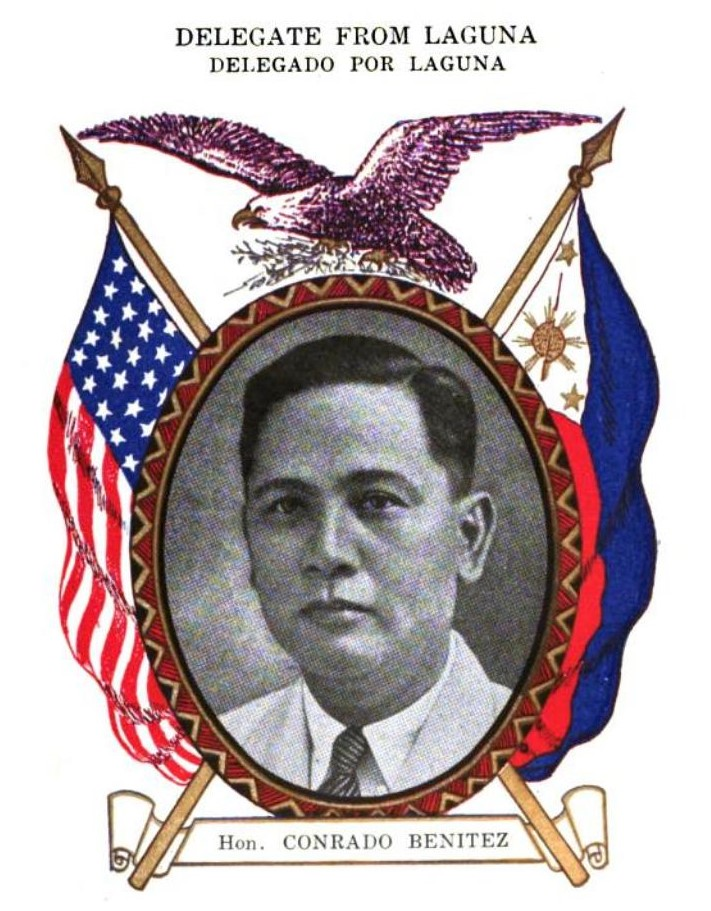
Portrait of Benitez, published by Benipayo Press (c. 1935)

He taught history and economics at the Philippine Normal College. Later, he founded the College of Business Administration of the University of the Philippines, and became its first dean. He was also one of the founding trustees of the Philippine Women's University, the first university for women in Asia. He was the first chairman and co-founder of the Philippine Rural Reconstruction Movement (PRRM) and trustee of the International Institute of Rural Reconstruction (IIRR) - both of which were dedicated to people living in the rural areas. He also co-founded the Young Men's Christian Association (YMCA) in the Philippines.

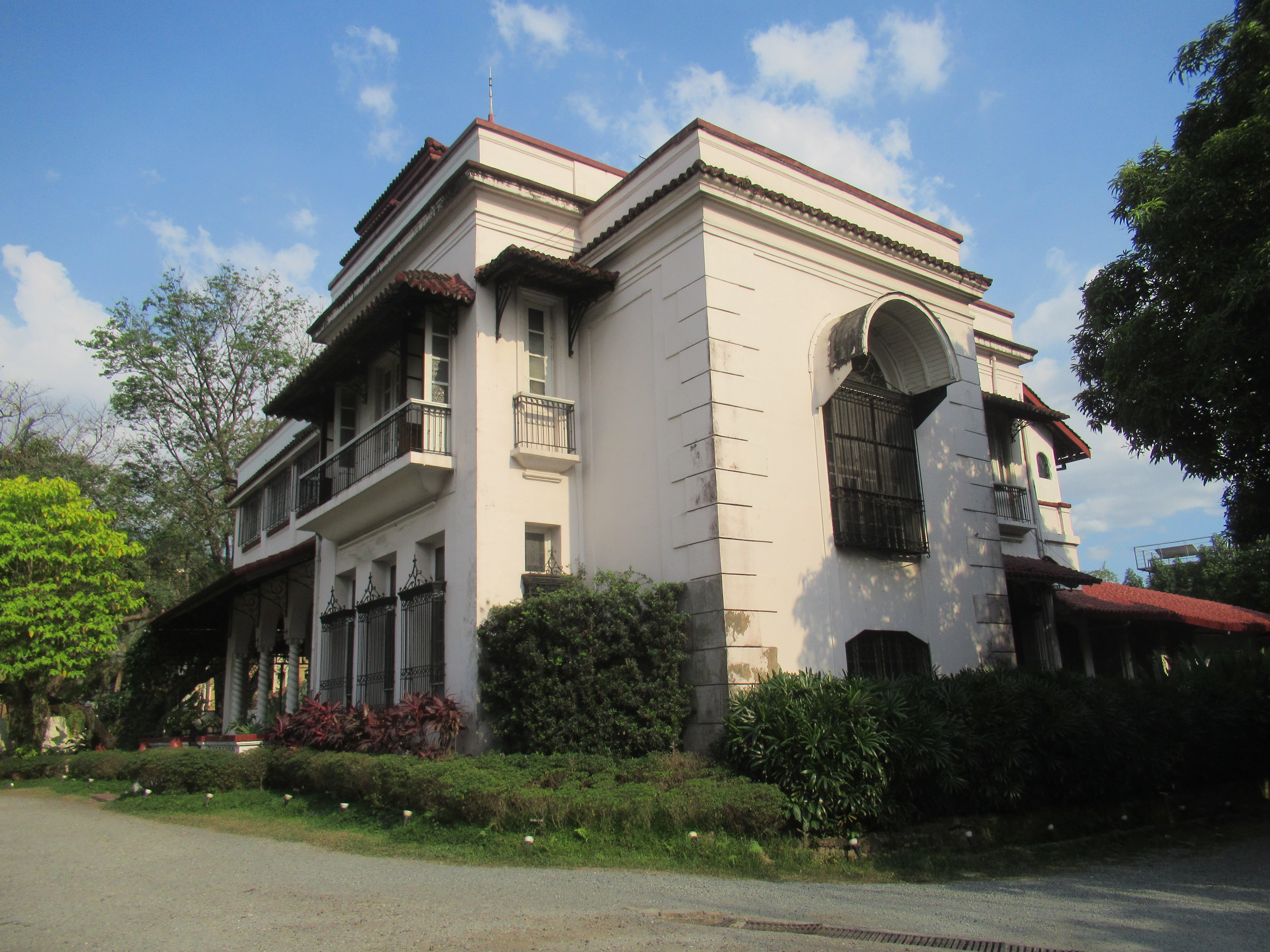
Mira-Nila House

In 1919, Benitez testified in front of the United States Senate Committee on the Philippines to explain the state of higher education in the Philippines. For a time, his 1926 textbook History of the Philippines was widely used in Philippine public schools.

In 1937, US President Franklin D. Roosevelt made him member of the Filipino-American joint committee charged with formulating economic plans in preparation for the country's independence. In 1938, he was appointed assistant executive secretary to the President Manuel Quezon.

== Freemasonry ==
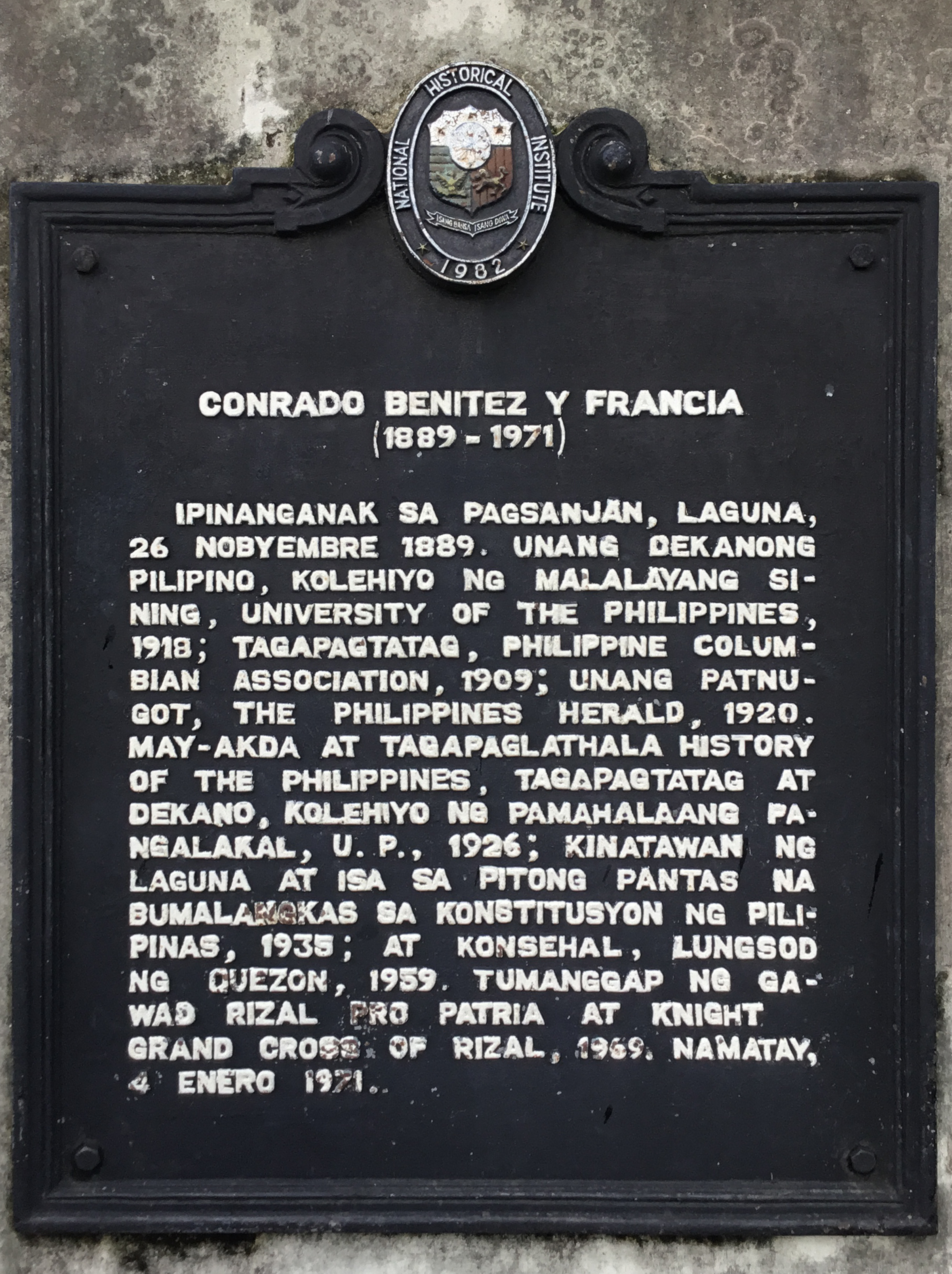
Conrado Benitez house and lot with NHI Marker.

Benitez entered freemasonry in November 1914, where he was elected Junior Warden. In 1936, he was elected Grand Master of the Grand Lodge of the Philippines. His contemporaries include Jose Abad Santos, Trinidad H. Pardo de Tavera, Manuel L. Quezon, Francisco A. Delgado, Frederic H. Stevens, Teodoro M. Kalaw, and Manuel Camus. In 1961, Benitez was duly elected as the second Sovereign Grand Commander of the Philippine Supreme Council.

Benitez was also an Honorary Member of one foreign Supreme Council and the Grand Representative of four others. Aside from these he was a Shriner and a member of Lodge Perla del Oriente No. 1054, Scottish Constitution.

== Death ==
Benitez died on January 4, 1971.

== Personal life ==
He married Francisca Tirona-Benitez on August 3, 1912. His daughter, Helena Benitez, would eventually be elected to the Senate of the Philippines.
