= Javi Benitez =

Filipino politician (born 1994)

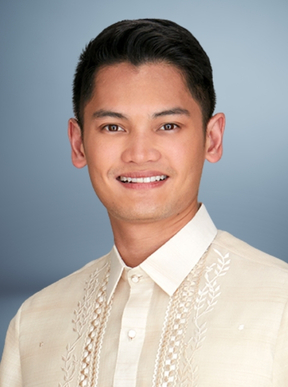
- Official portrait, 2025

Member of the Philippine House of Representatives from Negros Occidental's 3rd District
- Incumbent
- Assumed office June 30, 2025
- Preceded by: Jose Francisco Benitez

Mayor of Victorias
- In office June 30, 2022 – June 30, 2025
- Preceded by: Francis Frederick P. Palanca
- Succeeded by: Abelardo D. Bantug III

Personal details
- Born: Javier Miguel Lopez Benitez; October 8, 1994 (age 32)
- Party: PFP (since 2024)
- Other political affiliations: Independent (2021–2024)
- Parent: Albee Benitez (father)
- Relatives: Jose Francisco Benitez (uncle); Helena Benitez (great-grandaunt); Conrado Benitez (great-great-grandfather); Francisca Tirona (great-great-grandmother)
- Education: Santa Clara University (BS)
- Occupation: Politician, actor

Javier Miguel "Javi" Lopez Benitez (born October 8, 1994) is a Filipino politician and former actor who currently serves as the representative of Negros Occidental's 3rd district in the House of Representatives of the Philippines. He succeeded his uncle, Jose Francisco Benitez. Prior to his election to Congress in 2025, Benitez served as Mayor of Victorias from 2022 to 2025.

== Early life ==
Benitez is the son of Bacolod representative and former mayor Albee Benitez and Nikki Lopez-Benitez. He is the nephew of Technical Education and Skills Development Authority TESDA Director General and former rformer Negros Occidental Third District Representative and now Technical Education and Skills Development Authority (TESDA) Director General Jose.

== Political career ==
=== Mayor of Victorias (2022–2025) ===
Benitez was elected mayor of Victorias in the 2022 elections, running as an independent and receiving 36,263 votes (73.22%). He was sworn in on June 29, 2022, as the city's youngest mayor at 27. He took his oath before his uncle Francisco "Kiko" Benitez.

On assuming office, he outlined a six-point agenda covering dignified human settlement, disaster-resilient communities, diversified economy, dynamic governance, education for all, universal healthcare.

During his term, Victorias opened its first business process outsourcing site, which initially employed 50 workers, as part of efforts to diversify the city’s economy. His administration also entered into an agreement supporting the national government’s housing program and secured ₱55 million for the construction of a command and evacuation center.

Other projects undertaken during his administration included the Sidlak Residential Complex, the Victorias City Command and Evacuation Center, Project VECTOR, Sidlak Learning Technologies, and partnerships involving digital payments and agricultural livelihood development. In 2024, the city also introduced a solar-powered water supply system intended to provide a clean and reliable water source for local communities.

Benitez delivered his final State of the City Address on May 5, 2025, in which he reviewed his administration’s programs and achievements.

=== Awards received by Victorias City during Benitez's term ===
Award	Awarding body	Year Awarded
2024 Seal of Good Local Governance	Department of the Interior and Local Government	2024
Digital Democracy Award Champion	Makati Business Club	2024
One of the Top Performing Agencies in Visayas and Mindanao	Government Service Insurance System	2024
Philippine Model City - Second Runner-up	The Manila Times	2024
Sustainability Champion	The Manila Times	2024
Tourism and Culture Hub Champion	The Manila Times	2024
Tech Territory Champion	The Manila Times	2024
Food Security Enabler - First Runner-up	The Manila Times	2024
Outstanding BSP Stakeholder in the Visayas	Bangko Sentral ng Pilipinas	2024
Top 10 Most Improved Component City in the Philippines	Cities and Municipalities Competitiveness Index, Department of Trade and Industry	2024
Top 5 Most Competitive Component City in Western Visayas	Cities and Municipalities Competitiveness Index, Department of Trade and Industry	2024
Outstanding Creative Proposal for the Lunsod Lunsad Victorias in Motion project	Department of Trade and Industry	2024
Fourth Place, Tourism Champions Challenge	Department of Tourism	2024
Seal of Good Financial Housekeeping for fiscal year 2023	Department of the Interior and Local Government	2024
Digital Breakthrough Growth Awardee	GCash	2024
Special Award and Plaque of Recognition	Bureau of Jail Management and Penology Region VI	2024
Valuable Partner Award and Plaque of Appreciation	Bureau of Fire Protection Region VI	2024
Top 3 Performing Mayor in Western Visayas	RP-Mission and Development Foundation Inc.	2024
BAGANI Local Governance Awards -Potential Passer for the 2024 Seal of Good Local Governance	Department of the Interior and Local Government–Negros Occidental	2024
BAGANI Local Governance Awards - Recognition for localizing the Local Governance Quizzard	Department of the Interior and Local Government–Negros Occidental	2024
Champion, 28th Panaad sa Negros Festival Dance Competition	Province of Negros Occidental	2024
Top 5 Passer of the 2022 Seal of Child-Friendly Local Governance Audit	Provincial Council for the Protection of Children	2024
Top 4, Green Environment Award	Province of Negros Occidental	2024
2023 Seal of Good Local Governance	Department of the Interior and Local Government	2023
23rd Gawad KALASAG Seal and Special Awards for Excellence – Fully Compliant	Office of Civil Defense and National Disaster Risk Reduction and Management Council	2023
A Birder's Paradise - Top 5 LGU Proposal in the Tourism Champions Challenge	Department of Tourism	2023
Winner, Lunsod Lunsad: A Call for Creative Proposals	National Commission for Culture and the Arts and Department of Trade and Industry	2023
Third Place, Local Legislative Awards - Best-Performing Legislative Council	Philippine Councilors League and Department of the Interior and Local Government	2023
Electronic New Government Accounting System Grassroot Implementer Award	Government Financial Management Innovators Circle Inc.	2023
Top 3 Performing Mayor in Western Visayas	RP-Mission and Development Foundation Inc.	2023
2022 Anti-Drug Abuse Council Performance Award	Department of the Interior and Local Government	2023
Monthly Report Completers Recognition	Public Libraries Division, National Library of the Philippines	2023
Best City Jail of the Year, Type B Category	Bureau of Jail Management and Penology Region VI	2023
Plaque of Merit Awardee	Bureau of Jail Management and Penology Region VI	2023
One of the Top-Performing Local Social Welfare and Development Offices in Region VI	Department of Social Welfare and Development Region VI	2023
Social Protection Local Government Champion	Department of Social Welfare and Development Region VI	2023
Social Protection Executive Champion	Department of Social Welfare and Development Region VI	2023
2022 Good Financial Housekeeping Passer	Department of the Interior and Local Government	2023
Second Runner-up, Provincial Local Legislative Award	Department of the Interior and Local Government–Negros Occidental	2023
Special Recognition for Exemplary Public Service During the COVID-19 Pandemic	Civil Service Commission	2022
Special Citation for Support to the Rice Competitiveness Enhancement Fund Seed and Extension Programs	Philippine Rice Research Institute	2022
National Passer of the 2021 Seal of Good Local Governance for Barangays	Department of the Interior and Local Government	2022
Top 1 Highest Increase in Assessed Real Property Units among Component Cities in Region VI	Bureau of Local Government Finance and Regional Association of Treasurers and Assessors VI	2022
Exemplary Performance of the Anti-Drug Abuse Council and Peace and Order Council	Department of the Interior and Local Government - Negros Occidental and Region VI	2022
Highest Collection Efficiency on Premiums and Loans	Government Service Insurance System - Bacolod	2022
Abanse Negrense Good Environmental Governance Award - Adaptability Level	Provincial Government of Negros Occidental	2022

=== House of Representatives (since 2025) ===
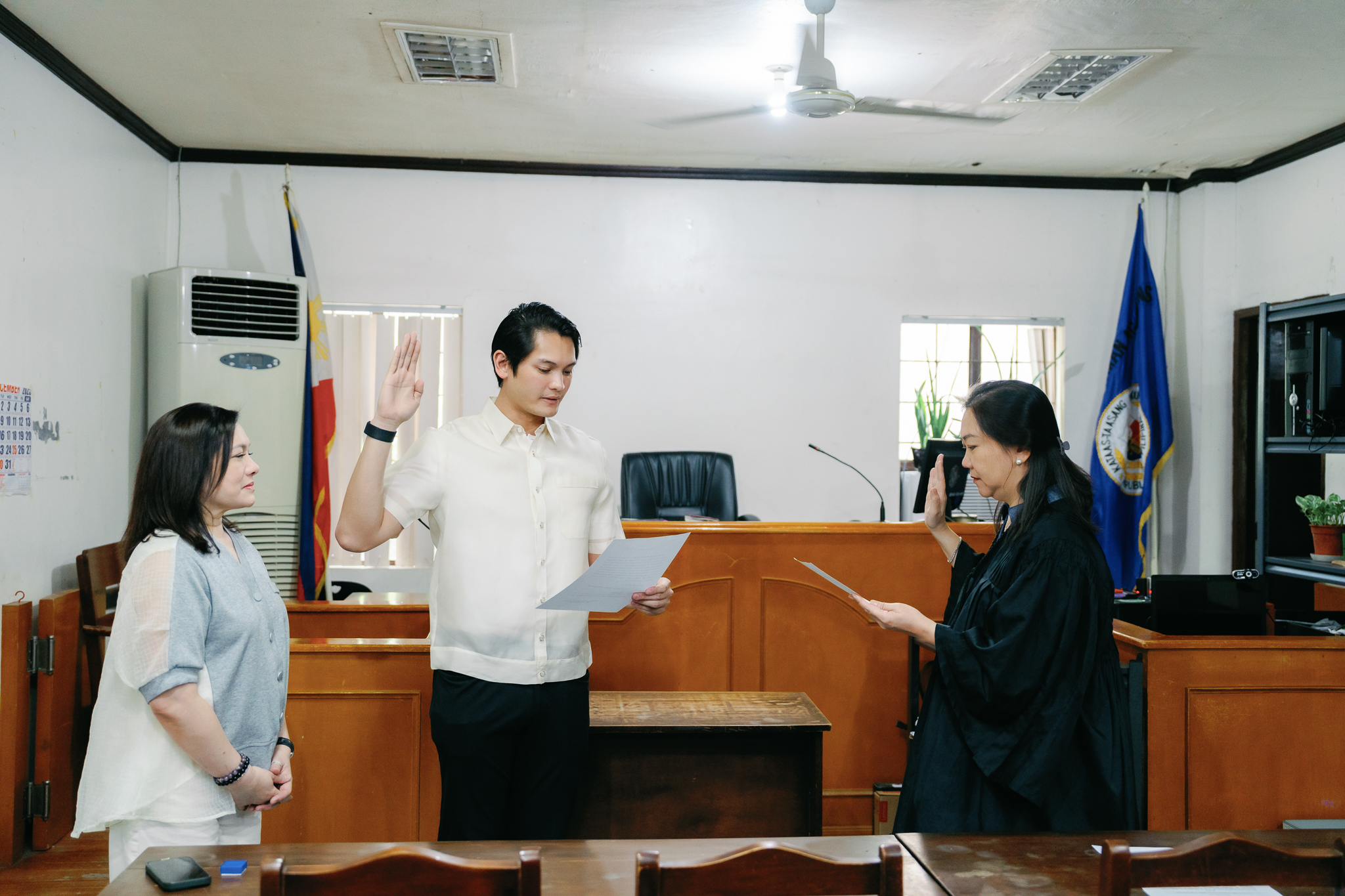
Benitez during his oath-taking ceremony as Representative of Negros Occidental’s Third District in June 5, 2025.

In the 20th Congress, Benitez became associated with a group of young lawmakers informally dubbed the “House Hotshots,” alongside Andrew Julian Romualdez, Brian Poe, and Ryan Recto. With an average age of just over 29, the group garnered media attention for their youth and perceived promise.

Benitez, however, clarified that the moniker was not an official designation, quipping that he initially thought it signaled a boy band comeback. “It’s just a few of us young lawmakers trying to serve with purpose,” he wrote in a social media post. Despite the informal nickname, Benitez emphasized the group’s commitment to meaningful legislative work, stating, “Let’s earn it with action, not hype.”

In the first month of Benitez's term, he has principally authored 44 house bills.

Benitez was appointed as one of the assistant majority floor leaders in the House of Representatives. He was also appointed as chairman of the Special Committee on Creative Industry and Performing Arts. He serves as head of the Technical Working Group on Artificial Intelligence under the Committee on Information and Communications Technology and as head of the Technical Working Group on the Circular Economy.

Committee Memberships
Committee	Position
Special Committee on Creative Industries	Chairperson
Committee on Disaster Resilience	Vice Chairperson
Committee on Agriculture and Food	Member
Committee on Basic Education and Culture	Member
Committee on Dangerous Drugs	Member
Committee on Higher and Technical Education	Member
Committee on Information and Communications Technology	Member
Committee on Public Accounts	Member
Committee on Trade and Industry	Member
Committee on Ways and Means	Member
Committee on Appropriations	Member
Committee on Legislative Franchises	Member
Committee on Visayas Development	Member
Committee on Women and Gender Equality	Member
Committee on Globalization and WTO	Member

== Personal life ==
Benitez was previously in a long-term relationship with actress Sue Ramirez. In November 2024, he confirmed their breakup, stating in an Instagram post that although they had built a meaningful relationship over five years, they had parted ways several months earlier.

== Electoral history ==
Electoral history of Javi Benitez
Year	Office	Party	Votes received				Result
Year	Office	Party	Total	%	P.	Swing	Result
2022	Mayor of Victorias	IND	36,263	73.22%	1st	—N/a	Won
2025	Representative (Negros Occidental–3rd)	PFP	200,044	92.03%	1st	—N/a	Won
