= Francisca Tirona =

Filipina educator and civic leader (1886–1972)

Francisca Tirona-Benitez (June 4, 1886 – November 17, 1974) was a Filipino educator, humanitarian, civic leader, and administrator. She is a co-founder of the Philippine Women's University.

== Early life and education ==
Francisca Tirona was born in Imus, Cavite, on June 4, 1886. Her parents are Guillermo Tirona and Jacoba Paredes, both are school teachers. She had her elementary education at the public elementary school for girls in Imus and at the Escuela Catolica in Manila. She then attended Cavite High School. In 1903, she enrolled at the Philippine Normal School, where she graduated as salutatorian. The Valedictorian that time was Conrado Benitez who is her ardent suitor whom she married on August 3, 1912.

== Career ==
She first taught at the Manila High School then in Sampaloc Elementary School. She was assigned as assistant superintendent of the Philippine Normal School. She also became the first Filipino teacher in the domestic science of the school. On her second year of teaching, while serving as the assistant dean of the girl's dormitory, she was inspired to found a school exclusively for girls who come to Manila for higher education.

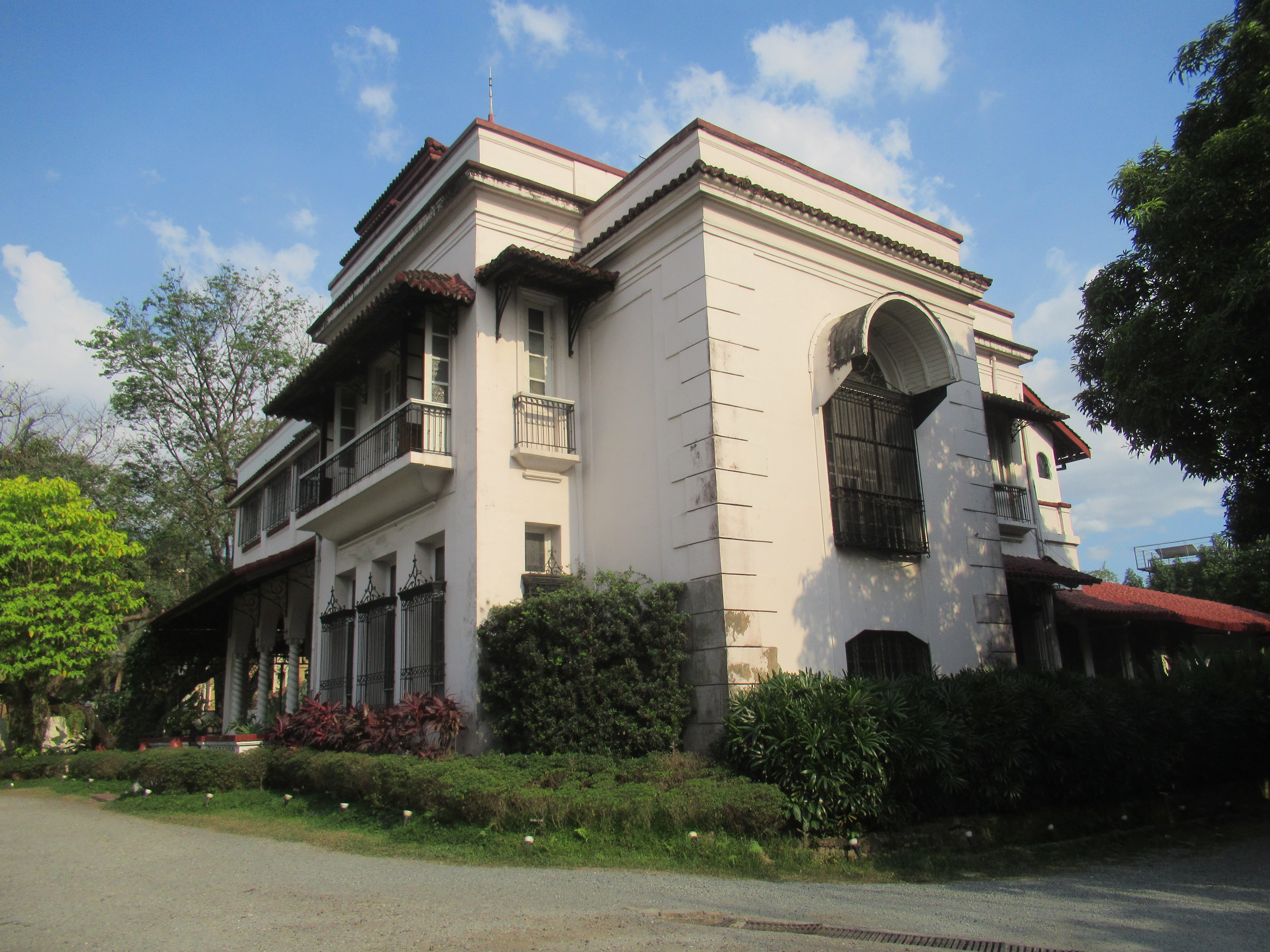
Mira-Nila House

Her dream was realized when she, together with six other women, founded the Philippine Women's College (later renamed to Philippine Women's University) in 1919. The college began adminitting enrollees from kindergarten up to third year high school on June 9, 1919. She was elected as its president in 1920. During the Japanese occupation period she was appointed by then President José Laurel as head of the Women's Bureau. When the war ended she came back to the Philippine Women's University where she served as its president until her retirement in 1965.

Tirona was also an active civic leader. She helped in founding of civic organizations including Gota de Leche where she served as director, Associacion de Damas Filipinas and the Civic Assembly of Women in the Philippines which later renamed National Council of Women of the Philippines.

== Later life and death ==
She was permanently disabled by a hip injury in 1970, and died on November 17, 1974, at the age of 88.

== Personal life ==
She was married to Conrado Benitez from 1912 until his death in 1971, and the mother of Helena Benitez.

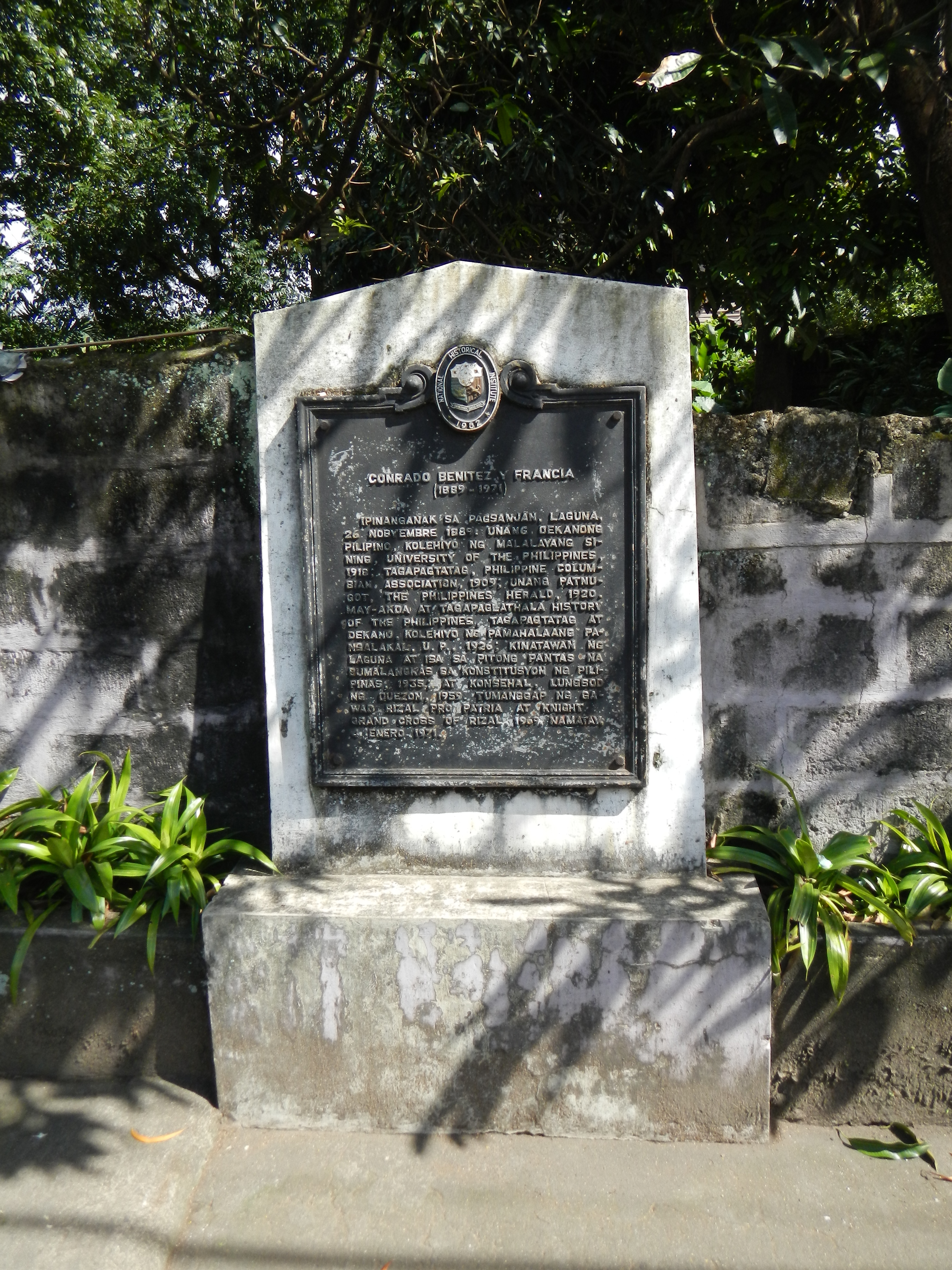
Conrado Benitez house and lot with NHI Marker.
