= Helena Benitez =

Filipino Senator and civic leader (1914–2016)

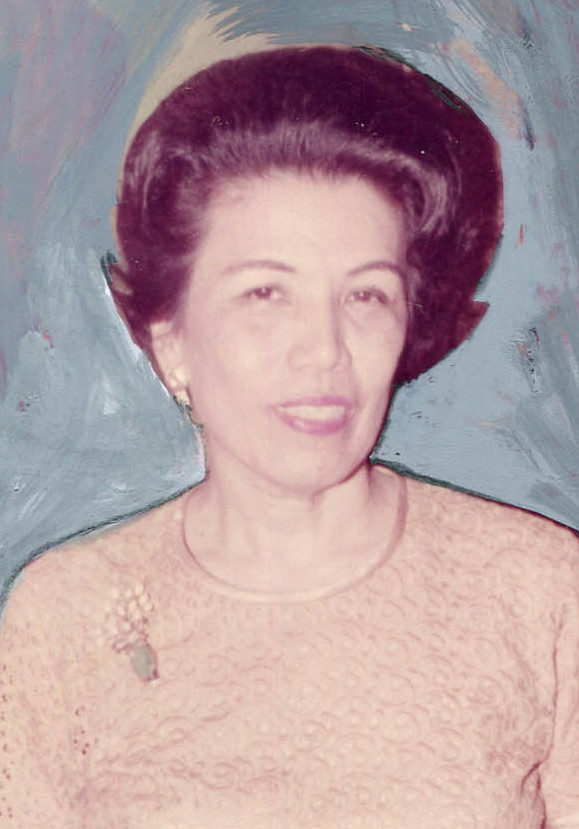

Member of the Batasang Pambansa from Cavite
- In office July 23, 1984 – March 25, 1986 Serving with Renato Dragon and Cesar Virata

Member of the Interim Batasang Pambansa from Region IV-A
- In office June 12, 1978 – June 5, 1984

Senator of the Philippines
- In office December 30, 1967 – September 23, 1972

Personal details
- Born: Helena Zoila Tirona Benitez; June 27, 1914 Manila, Philippine Islands
- Died: July 14, 2016 (aged 102) Manila, Philippines
- Party: Independent (1986–2016)
- Other political affiliations: KBL (1978–1986); Nacionalista (1967–1978)
- Relations: Marielle Javellana (grandniece); Albee Benitez (grandnephew); Jose Francisco Benitez (grandnephew); Javi Benitez (great-grandnephew)
- Parent(s): Conrado Benitez (father); Francisca Tirona (mother)
- Education: Philippine Women's University; George Washington University; University of Chicago; Iowa State College
- Occupation: Educator; Politician

Helena Zoila Tirona Benitez (June 27, 1914 – July 14, 2016) was a Filipina academic and administrator of the Philippine Women's University.

== Early life and education ==
Benitez was born in Manila to Conrado Benitez, a pensionado to the United States and a member of the 1935 Constitutional Convention, and Francisca Tirona who was an educator and co-founder of Philippine Women's College in 1919. She graduated from Philippine Women's University and was a student at George Washington University (where she was Chair of the UN Commission on the Status of Women in 1969 and the first woman to serve as President of the UN Environment Program in 1975). She also took post graduate training from the University of Chicago and Iowa State University.

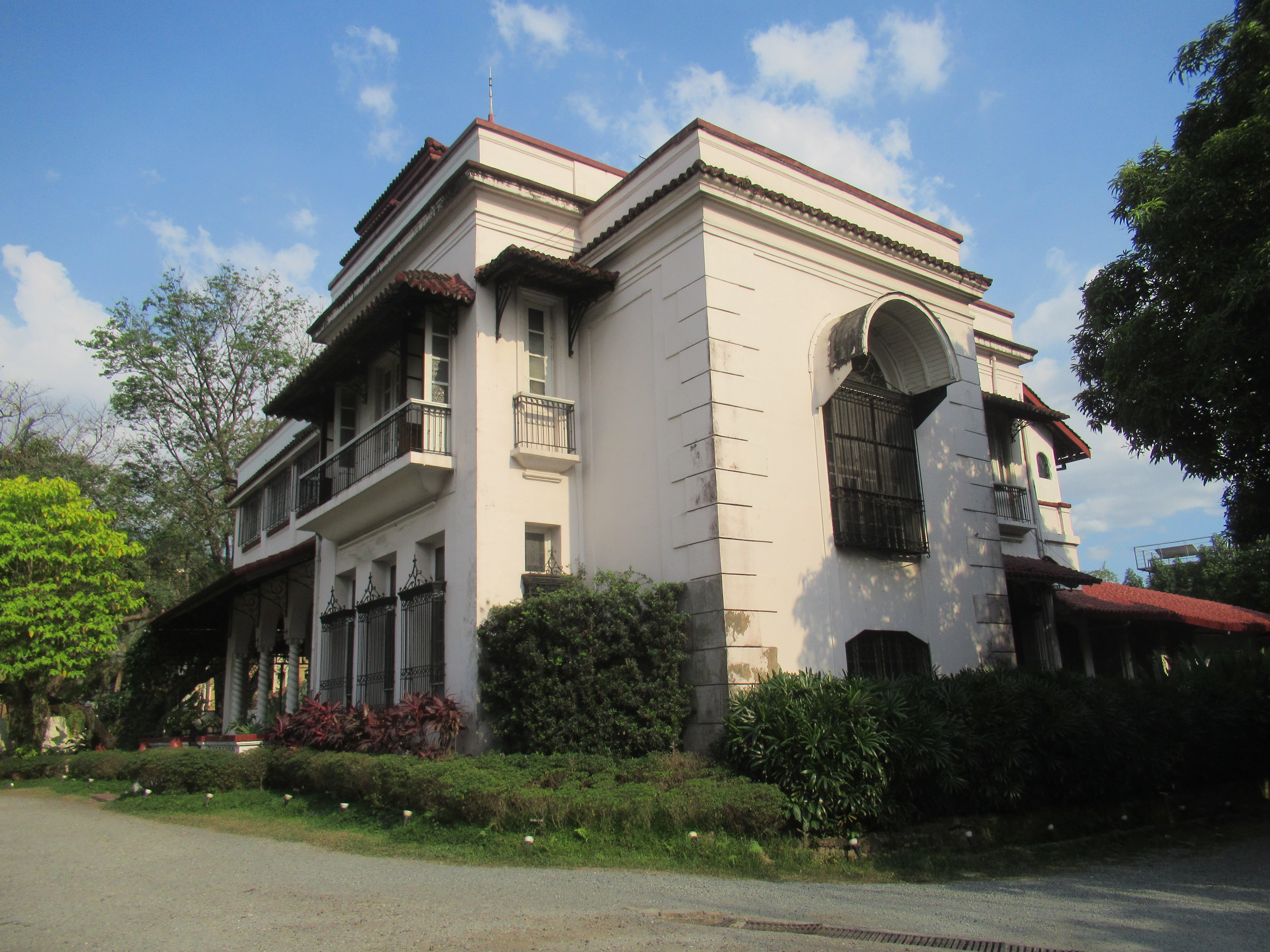
Mira-Nila House

== Politics ==
She served in the Senate of the Philippines from 1967 until Congress was closed when martial law was declared in 1972, and at the Batasang Pambansa from 1978 until it was abolished in 1986. Benitez wrote several bills involving the promotion of Filipino national culture, including Republic Act 5871, which established commissions devoted to preserving cultural artifacts. These commissions tried to revive indigenous arts and crafts through training, facilitation workshops, and funding institutions.

== Cultural advocacy ==
Benitez also founded the Bayanihan Dance Company. Benitez was also the executive producer of the Bayanihan. Benitez was proud of the fact that the Bayanihan had highly authentic costumes and instruments from Filipino "tribal" peoples. She emphasized authenticity in the troupe's performance. She founded the troupe to be evidence of Philippine culture to the world. She negotiated a contract with Sol Hurok for the Bayanihan to perform on Broadway in New York City and got an exclusive endorsement from Philippine President Carlos P. Garcia, designating the Bayanihan as the official representation of Filipino traditional dance to the Americas and Europe. This led to the Bayanihan's historic performance on October 13, 1959, at the Winter Garden Theatre on Broadway, which paved the way for the Bayanihan becoming the most prominent Filipino dance troupe of that time.

== Death ==
Benitez died on July 14, 2016, aged 102. She was the oldest surviving Senator of the Philippines.

== See also ==
- List of centenarians (politicians and civil servants)
