= Negros Occidental National Science High School =

Public high school in Negros Occidental, Philippines

Location
- Estrella Road, Barangay XIV; Western Visayas; Victorias, Negros Occidental; Philippines; 10°53′22″N 123°05′56″E

Information
- Type: Public Science
- Motto: Soar High, Sci High!
- Established: 1997
- Principal: John Rey Ganne Y. Dolorosa
- Grades: 7 to 12
- Enrollment: 700+ (as of 2026-2027)
- Campus: Victorias, Negros Occidental
- Colors: Mighty blue, Radiant yellow
- Nickname: NONSHS, NONSci, SciHigh
- Newspaper: The Scholar, Ang Iskolar
- Affiliation: Republic of the Philippines, Department of Education, SDO Victorias

The Negros Occidental National Science High School or NONSHS is a public science high school at Estrella Road, Brgy. XIV, Victorias City, Negros Occidental, Philippines. It is a Department of Education-recognized National Science high school.

Its old name, Negros Occidental Science High School, was changed after fulfilling the qualifications and standards of a national-level secondary school. It was announced in June 2010, official resuming of classes. Major changes were applied to the school.

== History ==
The Negros Occidental National Science High School (NONSHS), formerly known as Negros Occidental Science High School (NOSHS), started its active curriculum in 1997. Primary school graduates take the entrance exam to be admitted to the school.
