= La Salle College–Victorias =

Roman Catholic college in Negros Occidental, Philippines

La Salle College-Victorias
- Location: Victorias, Negros Occidental, Philippines; 10°52′30″N 123°03′51″E
- Location in the Visayas Location in the Philippines

La Salle College-Victorias (formerly University of St. La Salle-Vicmico) is a private school in Victorias, Negros Occidental, in the Philippines, supervised by the University of St. La Salle.
