= Mira–Nila House =

Mira-Nila House
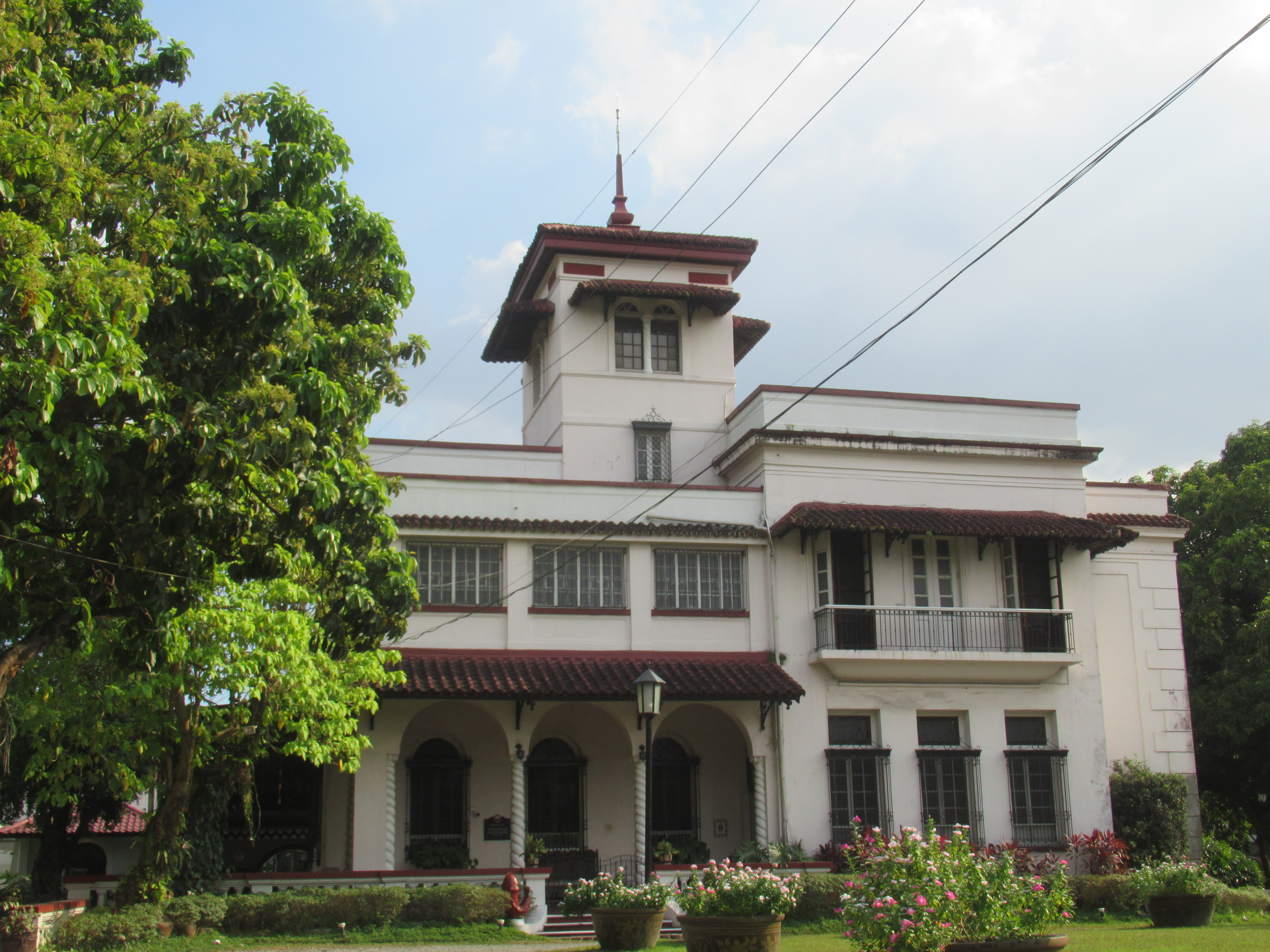
- Interactive map of the Mira-Nila House area

General information
- Status: Completed
- Architectural style: Art Deco
- Location: Quezon City, Philippines
- Coordinates: 14°36′41″N 121°03′00″E
- Completed: 1929
- Owner: Benitez family

Technical details
- Floor count: 4

Design and construction
- Architects: Francisca and Conrado Benítez
- Designations: Heritage House (2011-04-07; by the NHCP)

Website
- https://www.miranila.org

The Mira-Nila House is a historic mansion building in Quezon City, Metro Manila, Philippines. Situated along Mariposa Street in Cubao, the building owned by the Benitez family is a declared Heritage House by the National Historical Commission of the Philippines, and one of the only two such declared houses in Metro Manila along with the Lichauco Heritage House in Santa Ana, Manila. The building currently houses a museum.

== Architecture and design ==
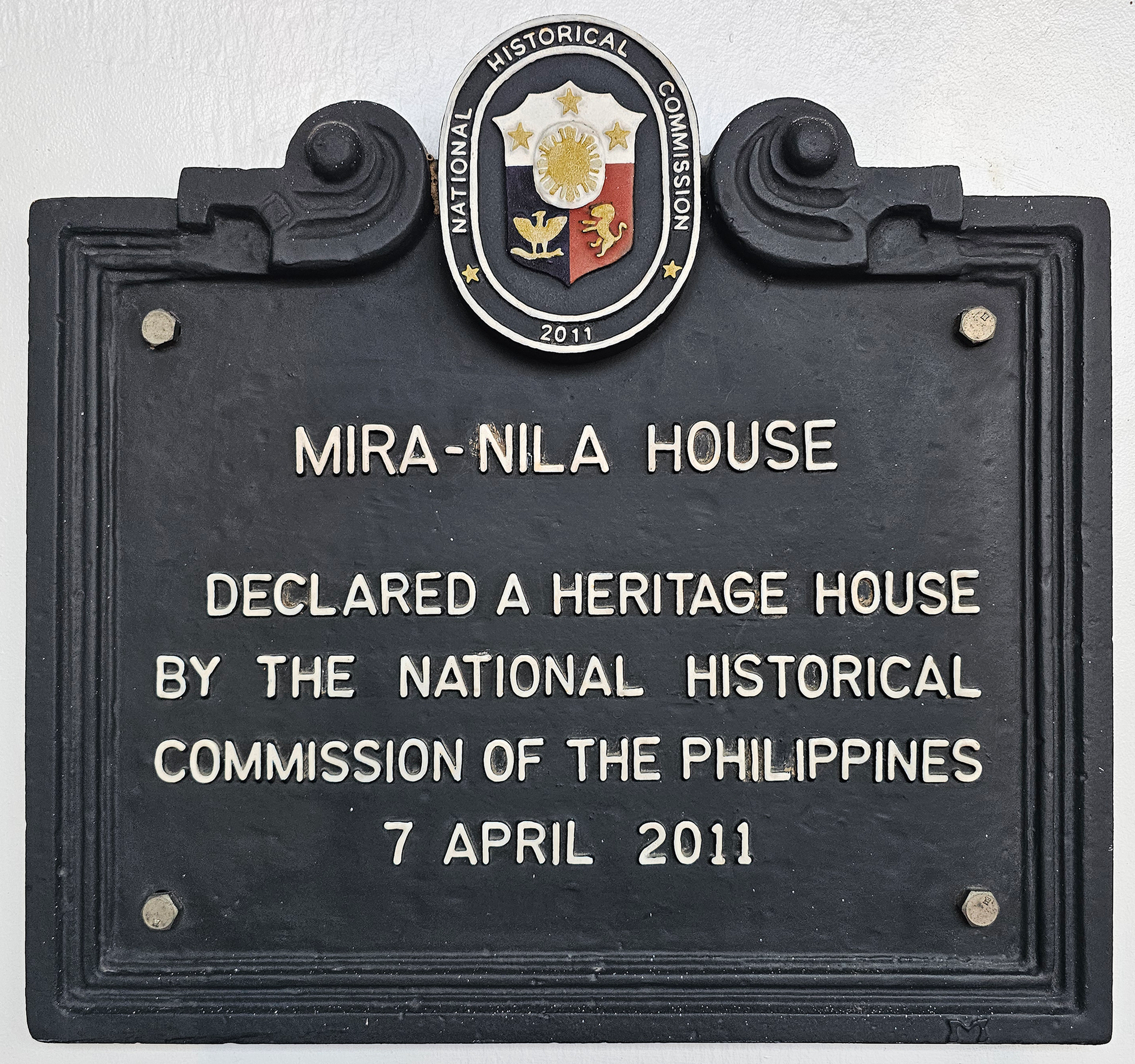
Historical marker installed by the National Historical Commission of the Philippines that states the house's declared heritage status.

The Mira-Nila is an Art Deco building inspired from the design of houses of similar architectural style in Florence, Italy. The house is four storeys high, has a basement, and a tower which served as an observation point. The design of the building was reportedly largely unaltered. The house's name came from the phrase "mira a Manila" ("look at Manila"), exclaimed by Helena Benitez, daughter of the owners of the house, when a fire broke out inside Intramuros in the 1930s.

A catalogue of Florentine houses from a Magazine brought home by three sisters of Francisca and Conrado Benítez from a Europe trip served as reference for the design. The Benitez couple themselves were responsible for the architectural design of the building and opted not to commission an architect.
