= Alfonso A. Ossorio =

Filipino American abstract expressionist artist

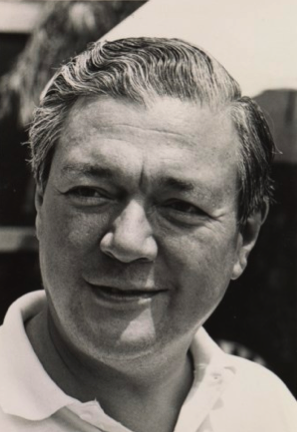
- Born: Alfonso Angel Yangco Ossorio; August 2, 1916; Manila, Philippine Islands
- Died: December 5, 1990 (aged 74); New York City, New York, United States
- Education: Harvard University, Rhode Island School of Design
- Known for: Painting
- Notable work: The Angry Christ mural, Congregations series
- Movement: Abstract expressionism

Alfonso Angel Yangco Ossorio (August 2, 1916 – December 5, 1990) was a Filipino American abstract expressionist artist who was born in Manila in 1916 to wealthy Filipino parents from the province of Negros Occidental. His heritage was Hispanic, Filipino, and Chinese. Between the ages of eight and thirteen, he attended school in England. At age fourteen, he moved to the United States. Ossorio attended Portsmouth Priory (now Portsmouth Abbey School) in Rhode Island, graduating in 1934. From 1934 to 1938, he studied fine art at Harvard University and then continued his studies at the Rhode Island School of Design. He became an American citizen in 1933 and served as a medical illustrator in the United States Army during World War II.

Ossorio's early work was surrealist. He was an admirer and early collector of the paintings of Jackson Pollock and a young Joseph Glasco who counted him as a good friend, and whose works influenced and were influenced by Ossorio. He also established a contact between Pollock and the young gallery owner Paul Facchetti from Paris through the painter and art historian Michel Tapié. Facchetti realized Pollock's first solo exhibition in Europe in 1952. In the early 1950s, Ossorio was pouring oil and enamel paints onto canvas in the style of the first abstract expressionist movement in the US.

In 1950, he was commissioned by the parish of St. Joseph in Victorias City, Negros Occidental in the Philippines to do a mural which would be known as "The Angry Christ" to complete the reconstruction of the church built by the Czech architect Antonín Raymond. Ossorio had this to say in a 1968 interview. "(The Angry Christ) is a continual last judgment with the sacrifice of the mass that is the continual reincarnation of God coming into this world. And it worked out beautifully because the services take place usually very early because of the heat and the church had been oriented so that the sun would come in and strike the celebrant as he stood at the altar with this enormous figure behind him. It worked, if I do say so myself. And although they loathed it at the time it was done it is almost now a place of pilgrimage."

Ossorio traveled to Paris to meet Jean Dubuffet in 1950. Dubuffet's interest in art brut opened up new vistas for Ossorio, who found release from society's preconceptions in the unstudied creativity of insane asylum inmates and children. On the advice of Pollock, Ossorio purchased an expansive 60-acre (240,000 m^{2}) estate, "The Creeks", in East Hampton in 1951, and lived there for more than forty years. He arranged to house and display Dubuffet's art brut collection there. In the 1950s, Ossorio began to create works resembling Dubuffet's assemblages. He affixed shells, bones, driftwood, nails, dolls' eyes, cabinet knobs, dice, costume jewelry, mirror shards, and children's toys to the panel surface. Ossorio called these assemblages congregations, with the term's obvious religious connotation.

Ossorio was represented alongside Dubuffet and nearly 140 other artists in the Museum of Modern Art's 1961 exhibition The Art of Assemblage, which introduced the practice to a broad public.

Ossorio died in New York City in 1990. Half his ashes were scattered at his grand estate The Creeks and the other half came to rest nine years later at Green River Cemetery alongside the remains of many other famous artists, writers and critics. After his death, his partner Edward "Ted" Dragon arranged for the sale of The Creeks, eventually selling it to Ronald Perelman complete with many of Ossorio's brightly colored found object art sculptures placed in among the groves of exotic evergreens that Ossorio had carefully planted in his final 20 years of life. Outside of The Creeks, Harvard Art Museum (Massachusetts), the Honolulu Museum of Art, the Housatonic Museum of Art (Bridgeport, Connecticut), and Washington D.C museums The Phillips Collection, National Gallery of Art, and Smithsonian American Art Museum, are among the public collections holding work by Alfonso A. Ossorio.

== Work ==
=== Angry Christ Mural ===
The centerpiece of the St. Joseph the Worker Parish Church in Victorias City, Negros Occidental, is the 60-square-meter liturgical mural entitled "The Angry Christ" (1950).

=== Congregations ===
Alfonso A. Ossorio, Forearmed, mixed media assemblage, 1967

In 1958, Alfonso Ossorio (1916-1990) began to experiment, incorporating found objects into his oil paintings. He initially introduced these items discreetly, but by 1959, buttons, shards, mirrors, fake gems, ropes and other miscellaneous objects often covered his surfaces. Oil had been replaced by plastic as the primary matrix, and soon after, painting was rejected for gathering. While artists like friend Jean Dubuffet often refer to their low-relief composites as assemblages, Ossorio coined the term “congregation,” a word with obvious ecclesiastical associations and that resonated with the artist's lifelong engagement with Catholicism. While “assemblage” emphasizes the cohesiveness of a group of elements, “congregation” conveys the multiplicity of unique entities within the work as a whole. Such a shift in focus complements Ossorio's own understanding of religion: “Religion must aim to inspire awe, to awe man with the splendor of his existence. By a set of unexpected juxtapositions, it must put you in a state of realization of how splendid things can be, even if they are horrible.” In his congregations, Ossorio created the unexpected by synthesizing forms of beauty with those of decay, by contrasting refinement with crudeness. For Ossorio, all objects had life, and bringing together disparate, ordinary elements, he also found a way to fuse art and spirituality. Ossorio continued to create daring congregations until his death in 1990.
