= Important Cultural Property (Philippines) =

Important Cultural Properties
- Mahalagang Yamang Pangkalinangan (Filipino)

Designation details
- Authority: National Commission for Culture and the Arts; National Historical Commission of the Philippines; National Museum of the Philippines
- Country: Philippines
- Listed in: Philippine Registry of Cultural Property

An Important Cultural Property (Filipino: Mahalagang Yamang Pangkalinangan) of the Philippines is a cultural property which has been singled out from among the innumerable cultural properties as possessing "exceptional cultural, artistic, or historical significance" to the Philippines.

It is the second level of protection after the classification of List of National Cultural Treasures in the Philippines.

The lists of cultural properties are declared by the National Commission for Culture and the Arts, National Historical Commission of the Philippines, and the National Museum of the Philippines. The last list of important cultural properties was published on December 15, 2015.

== See also ==
- List of Cultural Properties of the Philippines
- Suyat
