= Pritam & Eames =

Art Gallery in New York, NY

Coordinates: 40.963884°N 72.195304°W

Pritam & Eames is an art gallery associated with the American Studio Furniture movement which was established in 1981 by Bebe Pritam Johnson and Warren Eames Johnson in East Hampton, New York.

In 1990 to 1991, the gallery partners interviewed 14 of the artists who were early and continuing contributors to the gallery, which included:

- James Krenov,
- Wendell Castle,
- Jere Osgood,
- Judy Kensley McKie,
- David Ebner,
- Richard Scott Newman,
- Hank Gilpin,
- Alphonse Mattia,
- John Dunnigan,
- Wendy Maruyama,
- James Schriber,
- Timothy S. Philbrick,
- Michael Hurwitz,
- Thomas Hucker

These conversations were turned into a 2013 book, Speaking of Furniture: Conversations with 14 American Masters. In 2014, Bebe and Warren Johnson received the Award of Distinction from The Furniture Society. In the spring of 2015, Pritam & Eames re-located its exhibition space to The Gallery at Somes Sound on Mount Desert Island, Maine.
