= Janice Smith =

American woodworker and furniture maker

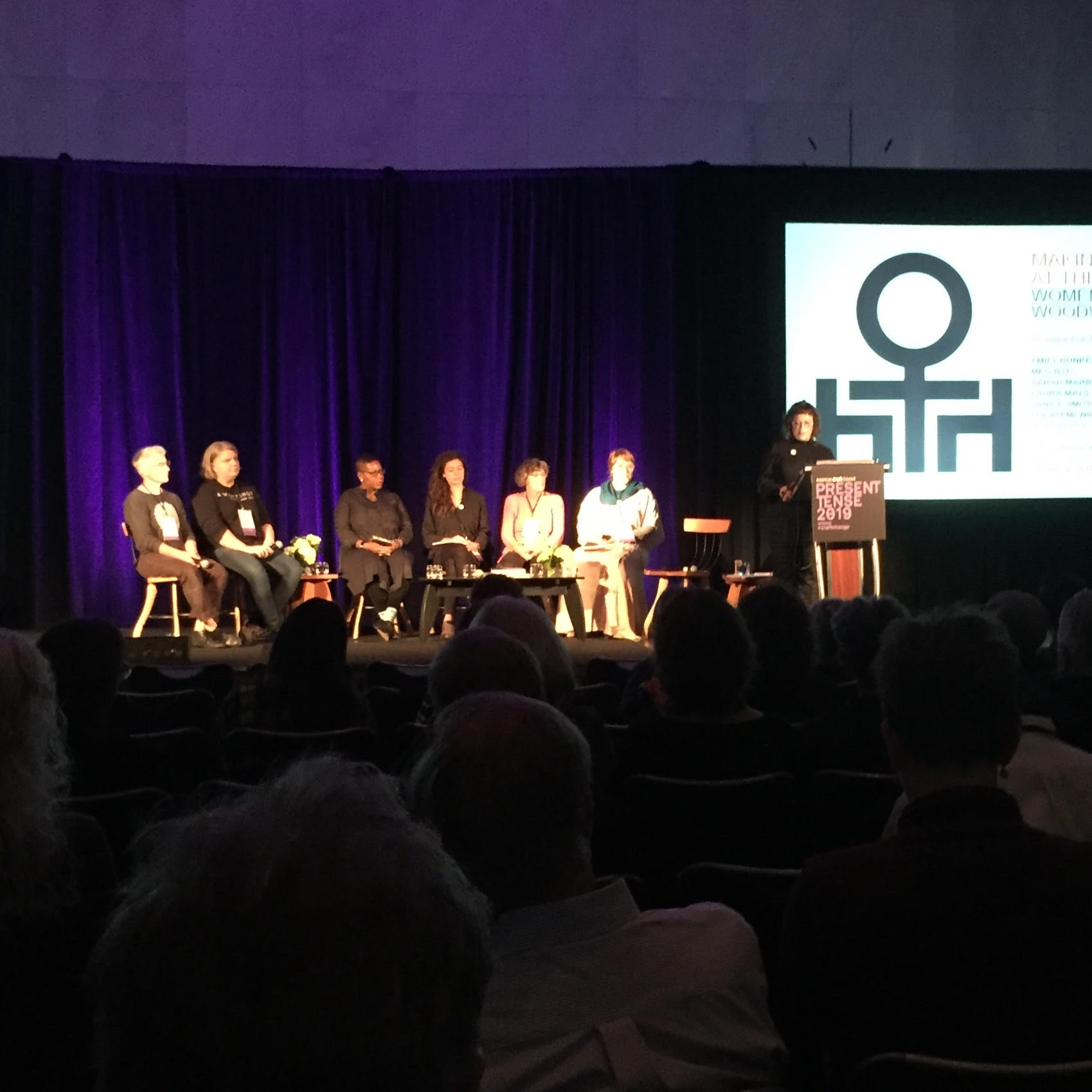
- Janice Smith speaking on a panel about Women's Woodworking at the American Craft Council Conference in Philadelphia.
- Education: Virginia Commonwealth University (BFA 1976), Rhode Island School of Design (MFA 1981)
- Occupations: Furniture maker, woodworker, sculptor, educator
- Known for: Furniture design
- Movement: American studio furniture
- Website: janicesmithfurniture.com

Janice Smith is an American furniture maker and educator, based in Philadelphia, Pennsylvania.

== Early life and education ==
Smith took a women's wood-shop class in high school and became hooked on woodworking. She attended Virginia Commonwealth University, located in Richmond, Virginia, and studied under furniture maker Alphonse Mattia. She later attended the Rhode Island School of Design, located in Providence, Rhode Island, studying furniture making under Tage Frid. Smith is a member of The Furniture Society and was an early artist involved with the American studio furniture movement.

== Art and design career ==
After graduating college in 1981 she worked for a small furniture maker and then a Rhode Island boat builder. Eventually, she started her own furniture making business creating custom furniture. Today, she continues to run a business, working alongside her husband, Reuben Wade, to design and build interiors and commercial remodeling.

In her work, Smith uses sculptural forms and aims to engage the viewer in all three dimensions, creating work that is both functional and exciting. Her work is dynamic, often geometric and angular or with sweeping lines and curves. In her furniture work, Smith uses Italian-made composite veneered plywood. To create thickness and dimension in her work, she often uses torsion boxes – hollow structures with a frame-like core and a plywood "skin", veneered to look solid.

The financial freedom from teaching at the University of Kansas, located in Lawrence, Kansas, allowed her to explore new directions with her work.

Smith's work has been featured in Wexler Gallery in Philadelphia and galleries and exhibitions across the country.

== Teaching ==
Smith taught industrial and interior design full-time at the University of Kansas from 1992 to 1998. She has taught part-time at Bucks County Community College, Moore College of Art and Design, and Drexel University. She also has taught carpentry to Philadelphia youth through the Mural Arts' Restorative Justice program.

At the American Craft Council conference held in Philadelphia in 2019, Smith spoke on a panel about women in woodworking hosted by Jennifer-Navva Milliken alongside woodworkers Laura Mays, Meg Bye, Emily Bunker, Fo Wilson (also known as Folayemi Wilson), and Sarah Marriage of A Workshop of Our Own.
