= Wendy Maruyama =

American educator and furniture designer (born 1952)

- Born: 1952 (age 73–74); La Junta, Colorado, U.S.
- Education: San Diego State University; Virginia Commonwealth University; Boston University; Rochester Institute of Technology
- Occupations: Visual artist, furniture designer, educator
- Website: wendymaruyama.com

Wendy Maruyama (born 1952) is an American visual artist, furniture maker, and educator from California. She was born in La Junta, Colorado.

Maruyama was influential in the early period of post-modern artistic furniture. She challenges the masculine environments within the field of woodworking. Her work uses humor, social commentary, sculptural forms, and color to challenge the accepted notions of furniture. Conceptually her work deals with social practices such as her Japanese-American heritage, feminism, and wildlife endangerment in Africa. Maruyama served as the head of the Furniture Design department at San Diego State University for 25 years.

== Early life and education ==
Maruyama is a third generation Japanese-American living in San Diego. She was born deaf in both ears and has worn a hearing aid since the age of nine. She studied woodworking at San Diego State University, where she received her BA in 1975. She then studied woodworking at the Virginia Commonwealth University in Richmond, Virginia. She transferred to Boston University's Program in Artistry from 1976 to 1978, where she studied under Alphonse Mattia and Jere Osgood. In 1980, she was one of the first women, and the first deaf student to complete an MFA at the Rochester Institute of Technology's School for American Crafts in New York.

== Career ==
=== Educator ===
Maruyama taught at the Appalachian Center for Crafts in Smithville, Tennessee, from 1980 to 1985, and served as head of the woodworking and furniture design program from 1982 to 1985. She then went on to work as the head of woodworking and furniture design at California College of Arts and Crafts in Oakland, California, from 1985 to 1989. After that she was the head of woodworking and furniture design at San Diego State University from 1989 to 2014.

She has taught workshops at craft schools including Penland School of Crafts in Penland, North Carolina, Haystack Mountain School of Crafts, in Deer Isle, Maine and Anderson Ranch Arts Center in Snowmass Village, Colorado.

=== Visual artist ===
Her earliest works in the 1970s were very typical of the style of that time, in which she used visible cabinetmaking skills, compound bent lamination, and celebration of complex wood grains and types. Along with Rosanne Somerson and Gail Fredell, Maruyama was one of the first women to break into the field of studio furniture. These women responded to the marginalization felt by a male-dominated field by making work that used complex joinery, bent lamination, and technical processes. Maruyama felt restricted by this type of highly technical furniture, and set out to make more expressive works during her time studying at the Rochester Institute of Technology.

Believing in the art of furniture making, Maruyama stated "I see furniture as a archetypal object that can also be expressive of the times. Furniture is capable of setting a certain mood and reflecting common ideals in our lives." In her early career she produced 15-20 pieces of furniture a year. She continued to produce about 6-8 pieces every year while teaching full-time and maintaining other responsibilities. The 1980s was an era of experimentation with forms and aesthetics, using colored surfaces, angular forms, and several mediums. Later in the 1980s, Maruyama entered what she describes as a "white period", of "post-nuclear primitive", as an opposition to nuclear testing. These works consisted of pale, white furniture that she imaged would exist after a nuclear holocaust.

Her 1982 piece, Mickey Mackintosh Chair, humorously pays homage to the cartoon character Mickey Mouse, but also speaks to the renown Scottish designers Charles Rennie Mackintosh and Margaret MacDonald Mackintosh. Maruyama's chair visually alludes to the iconic tall-backed Mackintosh Chair by the twentieth-century duo.

Her work is included in permanent collections at the Victoria and Albert Museum; Museum of Fine Arts, Houston; Los Angeles County Museum of Art, Dallas Museum of Art, Queen Victoria Museum and Art Gallery, Launceston, Australia; Museum of Fine Arts, Boston; Philadelphia Museum of Art; Museum of Arts and Design, New York; Mint Museum of Art, North Carolina; Fuller Craft Museum, Massachusetts; Mingei International Museum, California; and the Oakland Museum of California.

Maruyama had held a studio space in the Glashaus in Barrio Logan in San Diego for many years, until 2017 when the building was sold and renovated.

Maruyama has served as a member of the advisory of the Furniture Society. In 2009, she was inducted into the American Craft Council's College of Fellows for outstanding artistic achievement over her career.

Her work, Patterned Credenza, was acquired by the Smithsonian American Art Museum as part of the Renwick Gallery's 50th Anniversary Campaign.

==== WildLife Project ====
Maruyama's series titled "WildLife Project" was inspired by a trip to Kenya where she met with wildlife advocates to learn more about the dangers of poaching animals. This work draws attention to the wrongful slaughter of elephants and rhinoceroses for the harvest of their tusks for the $10 billion annual ivory industry. Maruyama places special interest on the unique social nature of elephants and their similarities to humans.

The series was started while Maruyama was a resident artist at the Pilchuck Glass School in Stanwood, Washington in 2013. During this time she created blown-glass tusks became part of the 2015 artwork Sarcophagus. WildLife consists of six life-sized elephant heads made from segments of painted wood stitched together. Each elephant reaches up to twelve feet tall, and resembles a hunting trophy. The show also includes a Buddhist-style Bell Shrine with burning incense and a bronze bell. The bell sounds every fifteen minutes to represent how often an elephant is killed for its tusks.

This work has been traveling the United States since 2015 and has been exhibited at The Chrysler Museum of Art, the San Francisco Museum of Craft and Design, the Museum for Art in Wood (formerly Center for Art in Wood), Penland School of Crafts, and the Oceanside Museum of Art. The exhibition is organized by the Houston Center for Contemporary Craft and is curated by Elizabeth Kozolowski. It was made possible through contributions from the Windgate Charitable Foundation.

==== Executive Order 9066 ====
Minidoka (2011), named after the Minidoka War Relocation Center, is composed of thousands of tags worn by Japanese Americans during their internment.

Wendy Maruyama: Executive Order 9066 is a series of works by Maruyama examining Franklin D. Roosevelt's 1942 Executive Order number 9066 which authorized the internment of 120,000 American citizens of Japanese ancestry. Maruyama's maternal relatives were among those imprisoned during this era. These works include Executive Order 9066, the Tag Project, and a selection of historical artifacts. They have been exhibited at the Museum of Craft and Design in San Francisco, The University Art Gallery at San Diego State University, and the Richard and Dolly Maas Gallery at SUNY Purchase. These works have been said to continue to be of importance during current times of political turmoil.

Executive Order 9066 is a series of wall-mounted cabinets alluding to themes common within these internment camps. These pieces include documentary photographs of Dorothy Lange and Tōyō Miyatake alongside barbed wire, tar paper, and domestic objects. These pieces also display actual objects owned or made by the internees in the camps, including suitcases used by families during their relocation and items made from materials available in the camps. The Tag Project consists of 120,000 replicas of the paper tags Japanese internees were forced to wear during relocation. The tags were grouped into bundles representing each one of the camps and suspended from the ceiling. Their purpose is to display the sheer mass of those displaced as well as to evoke a sense of humiliation endured by the Japanese internees. The making of this project involved the help of hundreds of community members to hand-write all of the names of the Japanese prisoners on the tags.

== Awards and distinctions ==
- Several National Endowment for the Arts grants for visual artists
- California Civil Liberties Public Education grant, 2010
- Japan/US fellowship
- Fulbright Research grant to work in the UK

== Exhibitions ==
Wendy Maruyama has held solo exhibitions in New York City; San Francisco; Scottsdale, Arizona; Indianapolis, Indiana; Savannah Georgia; and Easthampton, New York. She has also exhibited in Tokyo, Seoul and London.

Her exhibitions include:

- 1984 "Material Evidence"
- 1989 "Craft Today USA"
- 1990 - Solo Exhibition, Snyderman Gallery, New York, NY.
- 1995 - "Wendy Maruyama: Simple Pleasures and Indulgences", Peter Joseph Gallery, New York, NY.
- 1997 - "Hako", NUNO Inc., Japan.
- 1998 - "Wendy Maruyama: New Work", Joanne Rapp Gallery, Scottsdale, AZ.
- 1999 - Solo Exhibition, John Elder Gallery, New York, NY.
- 2000 - "In the Eye of the Beholder", Savannah College of Art and Design, Savannah, GA.
- 2002 - "The Inside Story", Herron School of Art, Indianapolis, IN.
- 2003 - "Turning Japanese", Pritam and Eames Gallery, East Hampton, NY.
- 2005 - "Men in Kimonos", Pritam and Eames Gallery, East Hampton, NY.
- 2009 - "Executive Order 9066", Richard and Dolly Maas Gallery, SUNY Purchase, NY.
- 2012 - "Mirror, Mirror", Velvet Da Vinci Gallery
- 2012 - "Wendy Maruyama: Executive Order 9066", The Society of Arts and Crafts, Boston, MA.
- 2013 - "Wendy Maruyama: Executive Order 9066", Arkansas Art Center, Little Rock, AR
- 2014 - "Executive Order 9066", The San Jose Institute of Contemporary Art, San Jose, CA
- 2016 - "Executive Order 9066 and The Tag Project", Boise Art Museum, Boise, ID
- 2016 - "Instructions to All Persons: Reflections on Executive Order 9066", Japanese American National Museum, Los Angeles, CA
- 2016 - "Wendy Maruyama: The WildLIFE Project", Penland School of Crafts Gallery, Penland, NC
- 2017 - "Wendy Maruyama: The WildLIFE Project", Oceanside Museum of Art, Oceanside, CA
- 2018 - "Wendy Maruyama: Executive Order 9066", Riverside Art Museum, Riverside, CA
- 2024 - "Wendy Maruyama: A Sculptural Survey in Wood; Craft, Material, Process 1972-2024", Fresno Art Museum, Fresno, CA
