= Rhode Island School of Design Museum =

Art & design museum in Rhode Island

Museum of Art, Rhode Island School of Design
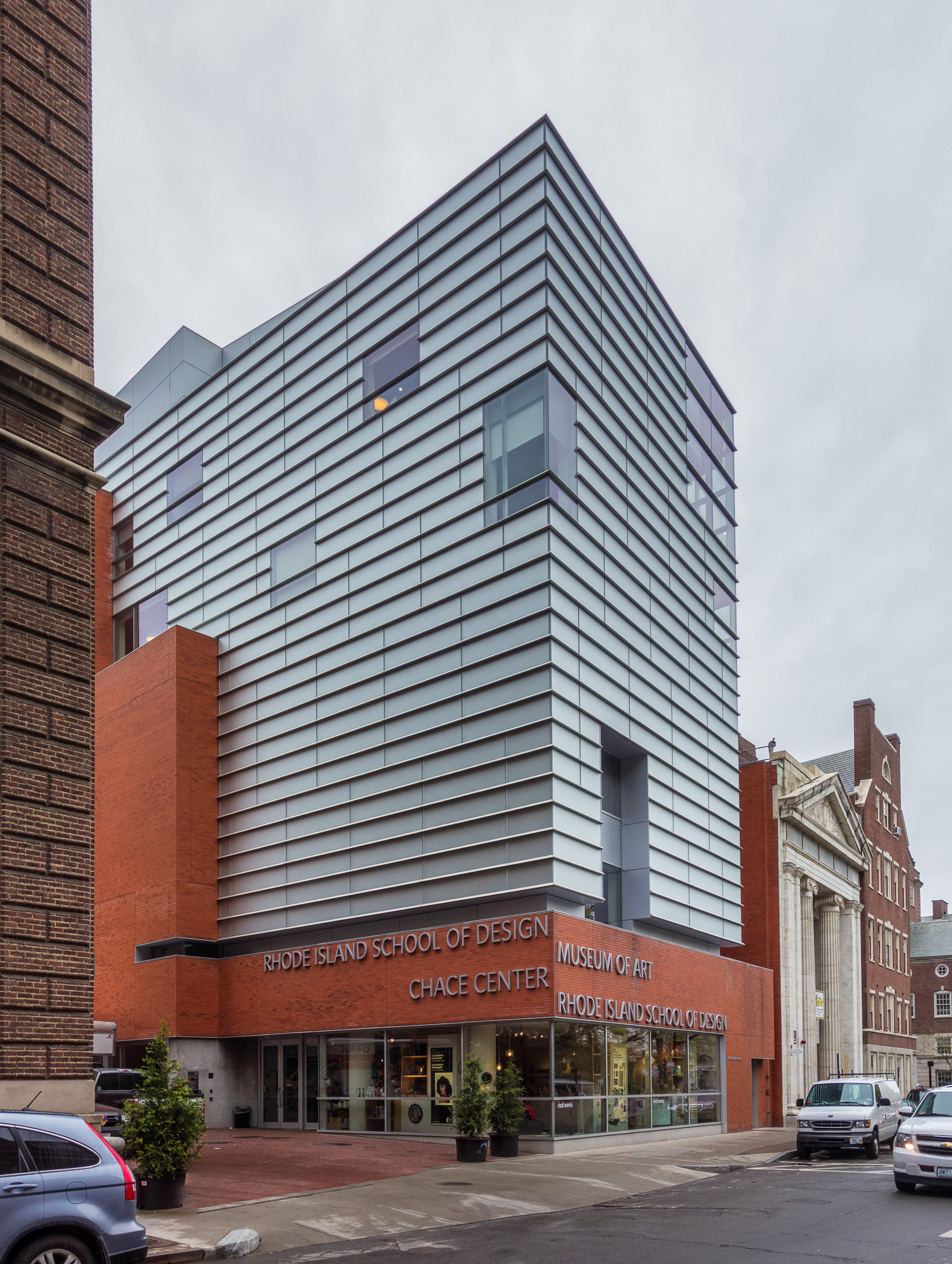
- The North Main Street museum entrance is at corner of the multifunction Chace Center building (2008).

- Location within Providence Location within Rhode Island Location within the United States
- Established: 1877
- Location: 20 North Main Street; Providence, RI 02903-2723 United States
- Coordinates: 41.826745°N 71.408553°W
- Type: Art and design
- Collection size: 100,000
- Director: Tsugumi Maki
- Public transit access: MBTA Providence/Stoughton Line Amtrak Northeast Regional Providence
- Website: risdmuseum.org

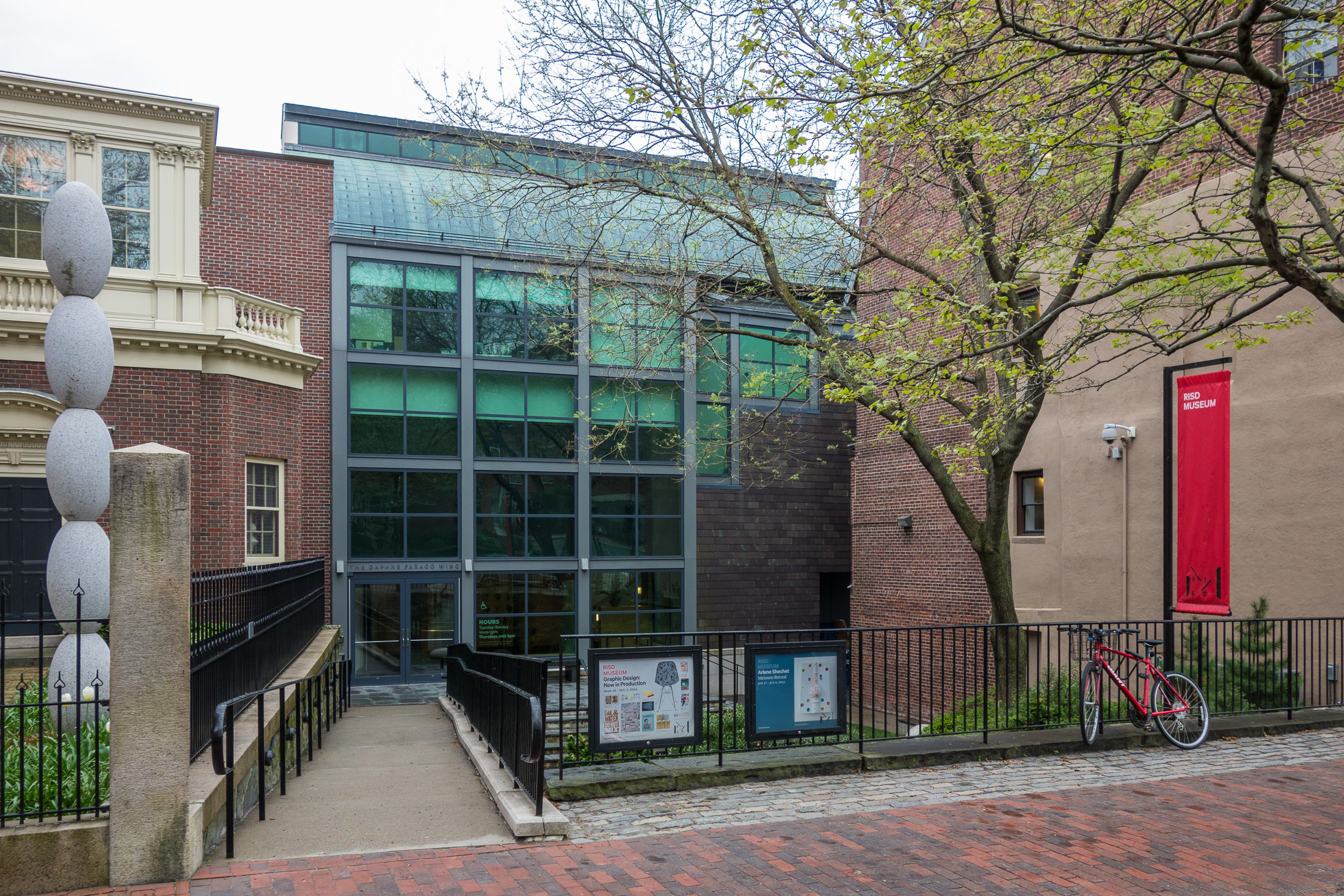
This modest entrance to the Daphne Farago Wing (1993) on Benefit Street connects directly to the four older buildings of the RISD Museum, and includes a small cafe.

The Museum of Art, Rhode Island School of Design, commonly known as the Rhode Island School of Design Museum (RISD Museum), is the art museum of the Rhode Island School of Design, a private art school in Providence, Rhode Island, United States. The museum was co-founded with the school in 1877. It is the 20th-largest art museum in the United States, and has seven curatorial departments.

== History and architectural development ==
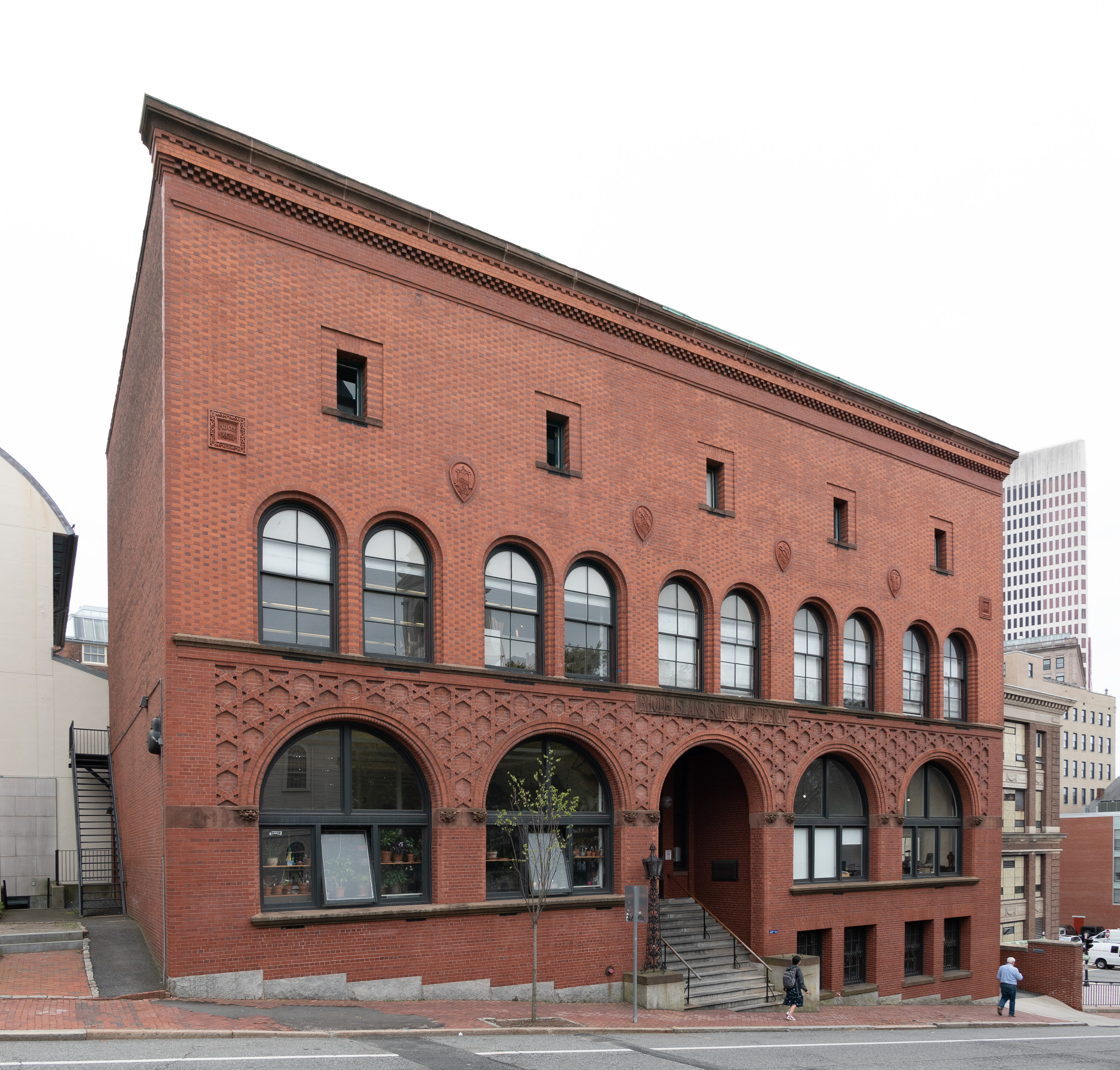
The Waterman Building (1893) was the first home of the RISD Museum, and still houses one of its galleries. The west portal of the East Side Trolley Tunnel opens immediately downslope of the right side of the building.

The RISD Museum was an integral part of the college from the inception of both in 1877. It serves as an art museum open to the public and a teaching facility for RISD students.

After the Civil War, Rhode Island had emerged as one of the most heavily industrialized states in the country. Local manufacturers became interested in improving the sales of their products through better design and began to seek out employees with expertise combining artistic and practical knowledge. Earlier, in 1854, the Rhode Island Art Association had been chartered "to establish in Providence a permanent Art Museum and Gallery of the Arts and Design". However, there were insufficient funds to accomplish this goal until 1877, when the Rhode Island Women's Centennial Commission allocated $1,675 to start the school and its associated museum.

The RISD Museum collection began with etchings and plaster casts of sculptures and architectural elements. The first public galleries were opened in 1893 in the structure now known as the Waterman Building, named after the street it resides on. In 1897, five additional galleries were constructed across the rear of the building, as a memorial to one of RISD’s founders, Helen Metcalf. Various members of the Metcalf family donated to the collection of plaster casts, which rapidly grew to almost 500 by the time the collection was dismantled in 1937. Artworks in other media gradually joined the collection, mostly from donations, since there was little funding for acquisitions.

In 1904, the museum received a major bequest from Charles Pendleton (1846–1904), a collector and dealer in English and American furniture, ceramics, and carpets. Pendleton House (1906) was constructed as a fireproof expansion of the museum, designed to appear as a residential home, and modeled on the donor's actual Federal-era home on Waterman Street. RISD became the first art museum in the country to devote an entire wing to decorative arts.

The RISD collections expanded greatly during the 1920s, when gifts and the growing endowment could fund the purchase of major artworks, as well as physical expansion. In 1924, the Metcalf Building was added, and in 1926 the Radeke Building was opened. Fronted by a modest-looking street level entry on Benefit Street, the latter new addition was a large 6-story structure built onto the side of the steep slope of College Hill. A central garden court, later named after Eliza Greene Metcalf Radeke, provided natural light and a view from the art galleries enclosing it on three sides.

During a brief but intense tenure from 1938 to 1941, German refugee Alexander Dorner (1893–1957) directed the museum in a transformation from a classics orientation to a more-contemporary focus. He also sought to emphasize unity and multiple cross-connections among the different nationally focused collections, along with a unified presentation of art and design across different media. An influx of European émigrés during, and after, World War II strengthened and deepened both curatorial expertise and the growth of the collections.

In the mid-1960s and early 1970s, the collecting of contemporary 20th century art accelerated, aided by funding from the National Endowment for the Arts. Another symbolic landmark event was the 1970 Raid the Icebox exhibition, curated by visiting artist Andy Warhol from the museum's extensive storerooms and archives. A number of significant art and design collections were added to the museum collections, requiring major expansion of physical facilities, as well as visitor accommodations.

In 1993, the Daphne Farago Wing, designed by Tony Atkin and Associates (Philadelphia), added two new galleries for contemporary art, the first major expansion of exhibition space since 1926. Its new entrance, relocated near the historic Benefit Street entrance, continued traditional upslope access from College Hill, even as the main library, undergrad dormitories, and graduate studios of the college were relocated downslope nearer to the river or in downtown Providence. The new building also contains a small coffee shop/cafe.

In September 2008, a substantial new addition to the RISD Museum and the college was opened to the public. Designed by architect José Rafael Moneo of Spain, the Chace Center connects to the third floor of the Radeke Building and the other three older buildings of the museum, via a short glassed-in bridge. A long, segmented outdoor stairway cuts a perpendicular straight line from Benefit Street to the lower campus, passing directly under the bridge. The $34 million center was built on a former parking lot in one of the few remaining open spaces near RISD, and it was named in honor of the late Malcolm and Beatrice "Happy" Oenslager Chace, a preservationist who worked to save historic buildings on Benefit Street. The Chace Center serves as the main entrance to the museum, facing a revitalized riverfront and downtown.

The building initially included a retail shop, as well as an auditorium and exhibition and classroom spaces. The retail shop was later converted into a programming space, now called the Common Room; the RISD Store is now located on the first floor of the Design Center at 30 North Main Street, just north of the museum entrance. The second floor of the Chace Center contains temporary galleries dedicated to exhibiting artworks by RISD students.

Many of RISD Museum's traditional exhibition spaces are still threaded on a linear axis though the four older buildings, and are reportedly confusing to navigate. Window openings have been bricked over, to better control lighting and increase display space. There are six levels of exhibition spaces, but no single building has more than four levels open to the public. A simplified schematic map is available for visitors to help them with orientation. There are multiple changes of floor level between buildings, but ramps and elevators have been installed to improve accessibility. Both museum entrances and galleries are wheelchair-accessible.

== Collections ==
=== General overview ===
The RISD Museum's collection of about 100,000 objects contains a broad range of works from around the world, including ancient Egypt, Asia, Africa, ancient Greece and Rome, Europe, and the Americas. Over 2,000 of these artworks are typically on display at any time. The RISD Museum has a comprehensive online catalog of almost all of its collection, and offers free access to digital images of its public domain materials. The collection is managed by seven curatorial departments.

Among the prominent international and American artists represented are Picasso, Monet, Manet, Paul Revere, Chanel, Andy Warhol, and Kara Walker. The collection also features notable works by Rhode Island artists and designers, including 18th-century Newport furniture makers Goddard and Townsend, and 19th-century Rhode Island painters such as Anglo-American impressionist John Noble Barlow and portraitist Gilbert Stuart.

=== Ancient art ===
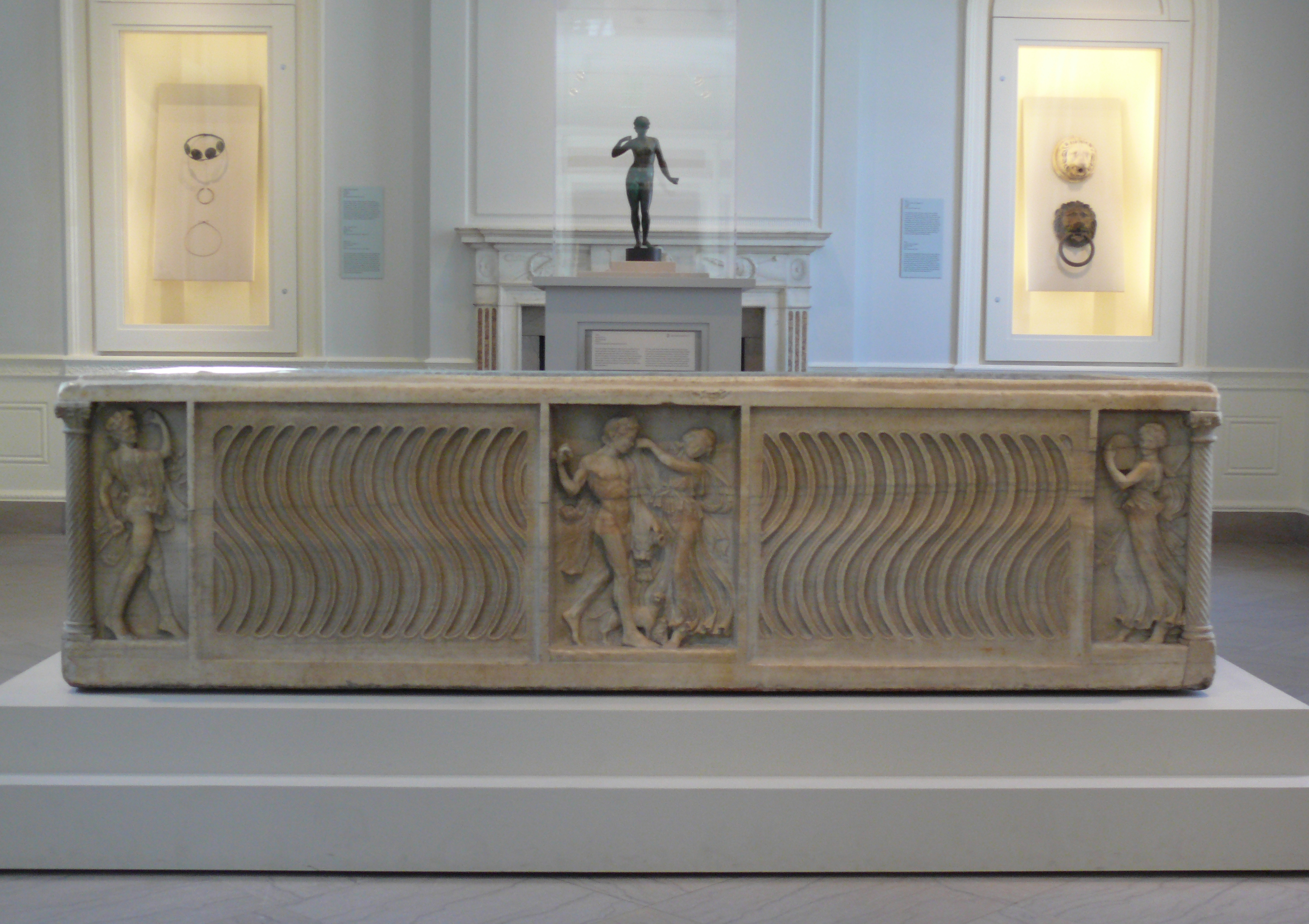
Roman sarcophagus (3rd century), with a rare bronze statue of Aphrodite in the distance

The department of Ancient Art includes bronze figural sculpture and vessels, a notable collection of Greek coins (grown out of the collection donated by Henry A. Greene), stone sculpture, Greek vases, paintings, and mosaics, a fine collection of Roman jewelry and glass, and teaching examples of terracottas. A number of objects are excellent examples in their categories. Among these virtually unique works of art are an Etruscan bronze situla (pail), a fifth-century BCE Greek female head in marble, and a rare Hellenistic bronze Aphrodite. Among the Greek vases are works by some of the major Attic painters, including Nikosthenes; the Brygos Painter; the Providence Painter; and the Pan, Lewis, and Reed Painters.

The cornerstone of the museum's Egyptian collection is the Ptolemaic period coffin and mummy of the priest Nesmin. Among other highlights of the Egyptian collection are a rare New Kingdom ceramic paint box, a relief fragment from the temple complex at Karnak, and a first-class collection of faience.

=== Asian art ===
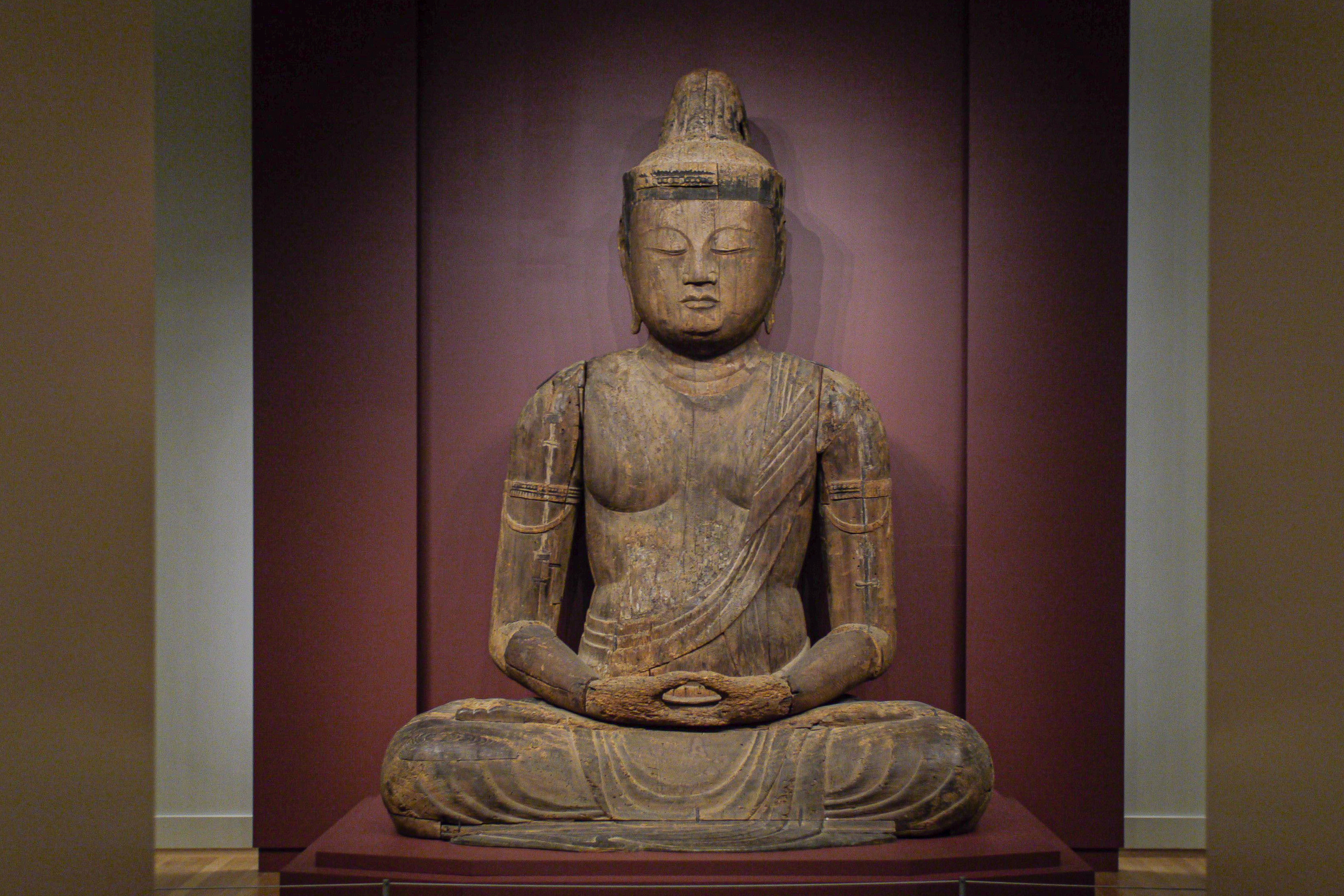
Buddha Mahavairocana is the largest wooden Japanese sculpture in the United States.

The RISD Museum's Asian Art collection contains ceramics, costume, prints, painting, sculpture, and textiles. One of the highlights of the collection is the peerless group of more than 700 19th-century Japanese prints which were collected by Abby Aldrich Rockefeller, considered among the finest assemblages of such work held outside Japan. The Japanese prints are shown, in rotation, in a gallery dedicated to their exhibition. A major attraction is the important 12th-century wooden Buddha Dainich Nyorai, the largest (over 9 feet (2.7 m) tall) historic Japanese wooden sculpture in the United States. The Buddha is on permanent exhibition in its own gallery.

The Japanese textiles are the core and glory of the Asian textile collection. The kesa, or Buddhist priests' robes, are the most numerous, with 104 examples. The 47 Japanese Noh robes, meticulously documented, form a comprehensive collection of nearly every type of costume in use in the Noh drama of 18th- and 19th-century Japan. Their vivid colors and patterns, embellished with gold and silver, express perfectly the splendor of the traditional and highly stylized Noh theater. The museum also has a collection of Indian saris and Chinese ceremonial robes. The Islamic and Indian collections include works of art in all media that celebrate the artistic heritage of the Arab, Indian, Persian, and Turkish cultures.

=== Contemporary art ===
Created in 2000, the Department of Contemporary Art oversees a collection of painting, sculpture, video, mixed media, and interdisciplinary work, dating from 1960 to the present. It is also responsible for the development of solo artist exhibitions and projects as well as thematic group presentations exploring key issues and trends in recent art, culture, and history. Represented in the collection are significant paintings by Emma Amos, Peter Doig, Carroll Dunham, Nicole Eisenman, David Hockney, Ellsworth Kelly, Karen Kilimnik, Agnes Martin, Joan Mitchell, Marina Perez Simão, Salman Toor, Cy Twombly, Andy Warhol and Karl Wirsum, among others. The collection also includes important sculptural work by Lynda Benglis, Louise Bourgeois, Nick Cave, Jeffrey Gibson, David Hammons, Simone Leigh, Rose B. Simpson, Sarah Sze, Robert Wilson, and Chen Zhen. The museum's video collection features works by such pioneers in the field as Vito Acconci, Lynda Benglis, Xavier Cha, Tony Cokes, Arthur Jafa, Bruce Nauman, Martha Rosler, Richard Serra, and William Wegman.

The Nancy Sayles Day Collection of Latin American Art includes works by such important artists as Luís Cruz Azaceta, Fernando Botero, José Bedia, Jesús Rafael Soto, Joaquín Torres-García, and Roberto Matta Echuarren. The Richard Brown Baker Collection of Contemporary British Art features paintings, sculptures, and installations by Martin Boyce, Karla Black, Liam Gillick, Lucy McKenzie, Susan Philipsz, Yinka Shonibare, and Cathy Wilkes, among others.

The department has a natural and strong connection with Providence's contemporary art community, and numerous RISD faculty and alumni and local artists are represented in the collection. Among them are Howard Ben Tré, Jonathan Bonner, Bob Dilworth, Jim Drain, Richard Fleischner, Ruth Dealy, Richard Merkin, Jordan Seaberry and Duane Slick.

=== Costumes and textiles ===
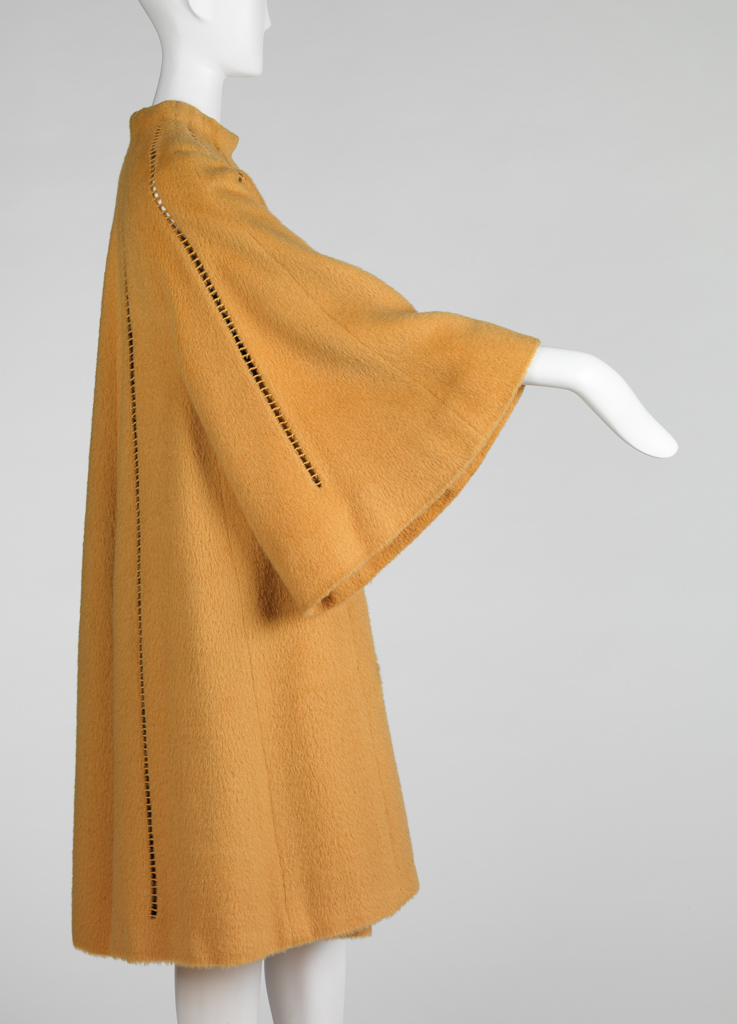
Swing Coat (1954), designed by Pierre Balmain

The RISD Museum has a large collection of historical textiles and items of dress, with a range that spans centuries from at least 1500 BCE to the present, and includes representative cloth and clothing from many geographic areas. Starting with items such a pair of Native American moccasins and a Hawaiian barkcloth acquired in the museum's early history, the collection has grown to include more than 26,000 objects. The earliest piece in the collection is a fragment from an ancient Egyptian tomb, but a major focus of the department's collecting agenda is the acquisition of contemporary fashion and textiles from all over the world.

The Costume and Textiles collections extends from examples of Elizabethan needlework, Italian Renaissance textiles, French printed toile de Jouey, Navajo chief's blankets, and fashions from famous European and American designers of the 19th and 20th centuries. Lucy Truman Aldrich is RISD's greatest single donor to the textile collection. Some of her donations include a Japanese Noh theater robes and Buddhist priest robes.

=== Decorative arts ===
The Decorative Arts collection encompasses European and American decorative arts (furniture, silver and other metalwork, wallpaper, ceramics, and glass) from the Medieval period to the present. A major highlight of the department is the Charles L. Pendleton Collection of furniture made by 18th-century Boston, New York, Philadelphia and Newport cabinetmakers. Pendleton House, the "wing" of the museum devoted to the exhibition of decorative arts, exhibits at least six pieces of furniture from the Goddard and Townsend circle of Newport cabinetmakers, including two of the renowned block-front, carved-shell desks-and-bookcases. Also on view in Pendleton House's period rooms are fine examples of English pottery, Chinese export porcelain, and a comprehensive survey of Rhode Island silver.

The Harold Brown Collection of French Empire furniture and objects with Napoleonic associations is another highlight of the department's holdings, as is the Lucy Truman Aldrich collection of rare 18th-century European porcelain figures. Some 360 examples of 18th- and early 19th-century French wallpaper from the M. and Mme. Charles Huard collection constitute the backbone of the museum's wallpaper collection, which is among the finest in the world. Many antique examples of wallpaper are now known to contain the poisonous and carcinogenic element arsenic, and the RISD Museum has published an article on its hazards and how to handle them.

The museum's collection is particularly strong in the area of 19th-century decorative arts. Important highlights include furniture by the American companies of Vose and Coates, Herter Brothers, and Alexander Roux; the Englishman Edward William Godwin (E.W. Godwin); and the French makers Guillaume Beneman and Hugnet Frères. Other highlights of the 19th century are works of art in glass by Lalique, Louis Comfort Tiffany, and Hector Guimard; ceramics by Wedgwood, Sèvres, and Royal Doulton; and silver by Christopher Dresser and Charles Robert Ashbee. Approximately 2,000 pieces produced by Providence's Gorham Manufacturing Company from the mid-19th through the mid-20th century are the foundation of a collection of American silverware, which also includes work by colonial silversmiths such as John Coney, Paul Revere, and Samuel Casey.

20th-century design in the collection includes furniture by Alvar Aalto, Verner Panton, Josef Hofmann, and Charles and Ray Eames; metalwork by Erik Magnussen; ceramics by Auguste Delaherche; glass by Frederick Carder; and wallpaper designs by Nancy McClelland, Alexander Calder, and Roy Lichtenstein. The mid 20th-century's revived interest in "craft" is represented by the work of Tage Frid, Wharton Esherick, John Prip, and Peter Voulkos. The RISD Museum is a leading collector of American contemporary craft and studio furniture, and many of the artists represented in the collection have ties to the school as alumni, faculty, or both. Among the contemporary craftspeople whose work is in the collection are: Dale Chihuly, Michael Glancy, Akio Takamori, Kurt Weiser, Judy Kensley McKie, Jere Osgood, Rosanne Somerson, and Alphonse Mattia.

=== Painting and sculpture ===
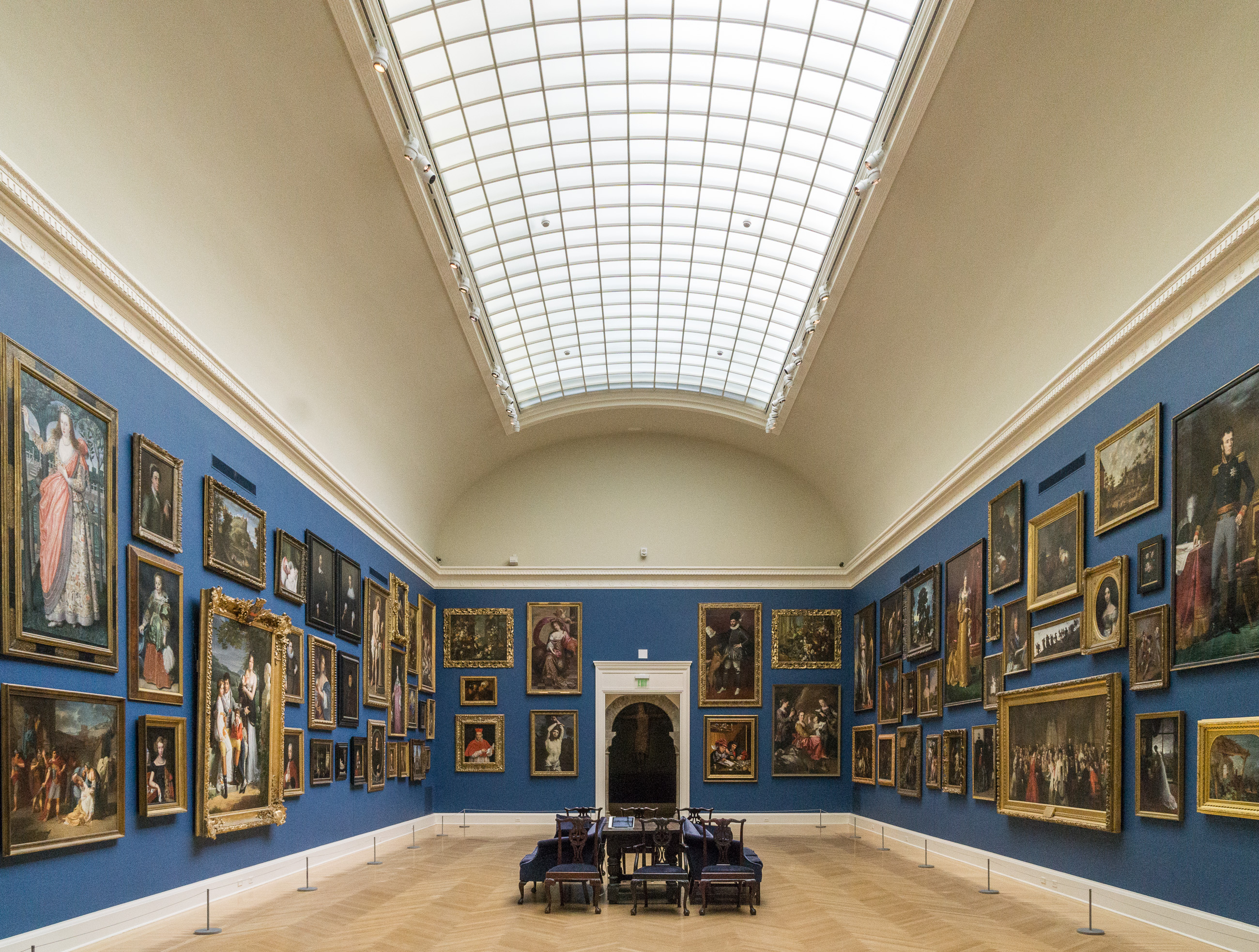
This salon-style gallery displays many paintings on multiple levels.

The Painting and Sculpture collection contains more than 2,500 works of European and American art from the medieval period up through 1960. The Italian Renaissance, and Baroque periods are represented by the work of Giovanni Battista Tiepolo, Lippo Memmi, Jacopo Sansovino, Alessandro Magnasco, and others. The collection also includes major work by such northern European masters as Tilman Riemenschneider, Hendrick Goltzius, Joachim Wtewael, Salomon van Ruysdael, and Georg Vischer. The 17th- and 18th-century masterpieces include paintings by Francisco Collantes, Sébastien Bourdon, Gabriel-Jacques de Saint-Aubin, Nicolas Poussin, Angelica Kauffman, and Joshua Reynolds.

Early 19th-century European art is represented by Thomas Lawrence, Hubert Robert, Louise-Joséphine Sarazin de Belmont, Joseph Chinard, Théodore Géricault, and others. The department has excellent examples of French Impressionism and Post-Impressionism paintings by such artists as Édouard Manet, Claude Monet, Edgar Degas, Paul Cézanne, and Pierre-Auguste Renoir. There is important work by 19th-century French sculptors Auguste Rodin, Charles Henri Joseph Cordier, Jules Dalou, and Jean-Baptiste Carpeaux. Among the 20th-century European painters in the collection are Pablo Picasso, Georges Braque, Henri Matisse, Raymond Duchamp-Villon, Fernand Léger, Oskar Kokoschka, and Henri Le Fauconnier.

The 18th- and 19th-century American collection is particularly strong, with important examples by such artists as John Singleton Copley, Gilbert Stuart, Thomas Cole, Winslow Homer, William Merritt Chase, Martin Johnson Heade, Mary Cassatt, John Singer Sargent, and Edward Mitchell Bannister, an African-American landscapist who spent his career as a painter in Rhode Island.

Significant works by George Wesley Bellows, Robert Henri, Charles Sheeler, Maxfield Parrish, Georgia O'Keeffe, John Twachtman, Hans Hofmann, Paul Manship, and Nancy Elizabeth Prophet, among others, represent American artistic achievements of the early 20th-century.

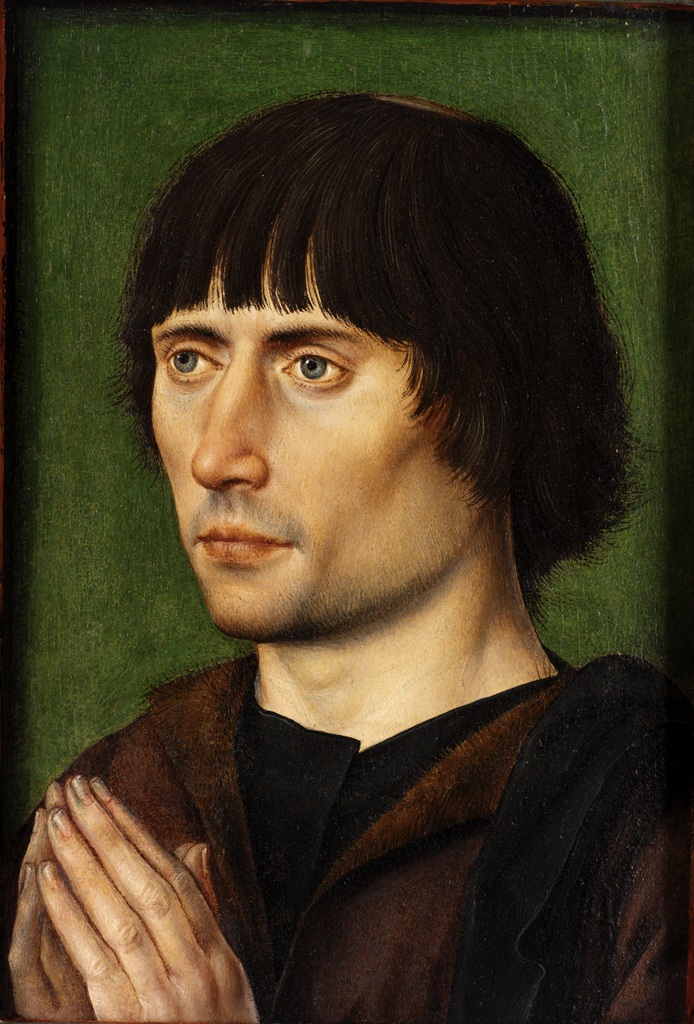
Bruges Master, Portrait of a Cleric (c. 1490)

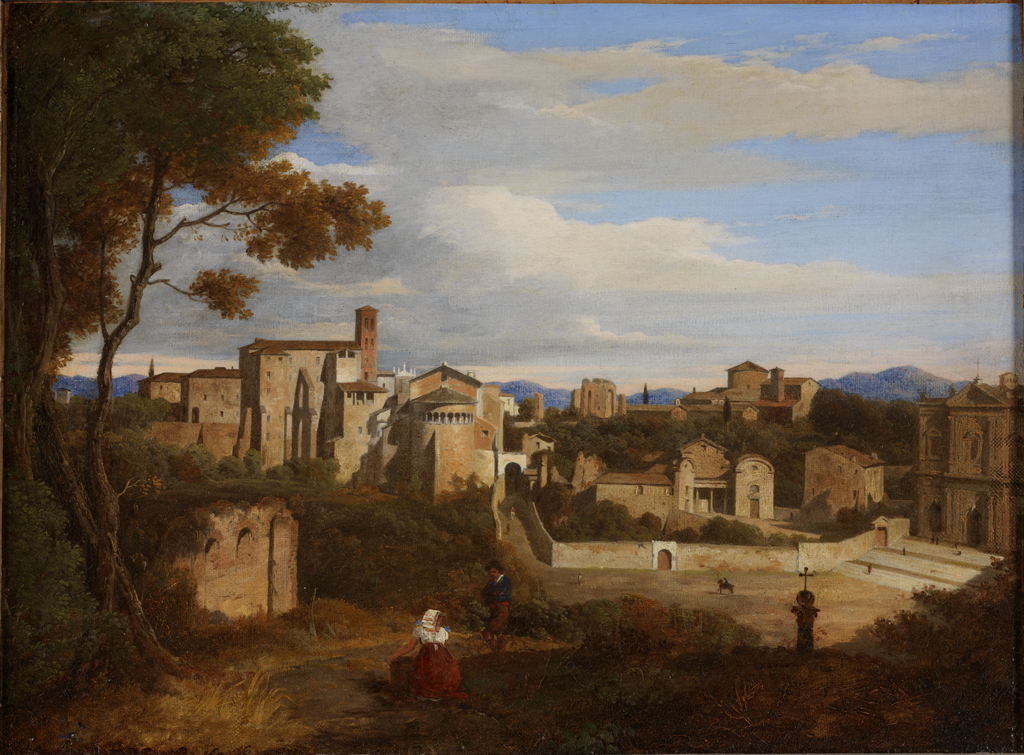
Charles Lock Eastlake, The Celian Hill from the Palatine, (1823)

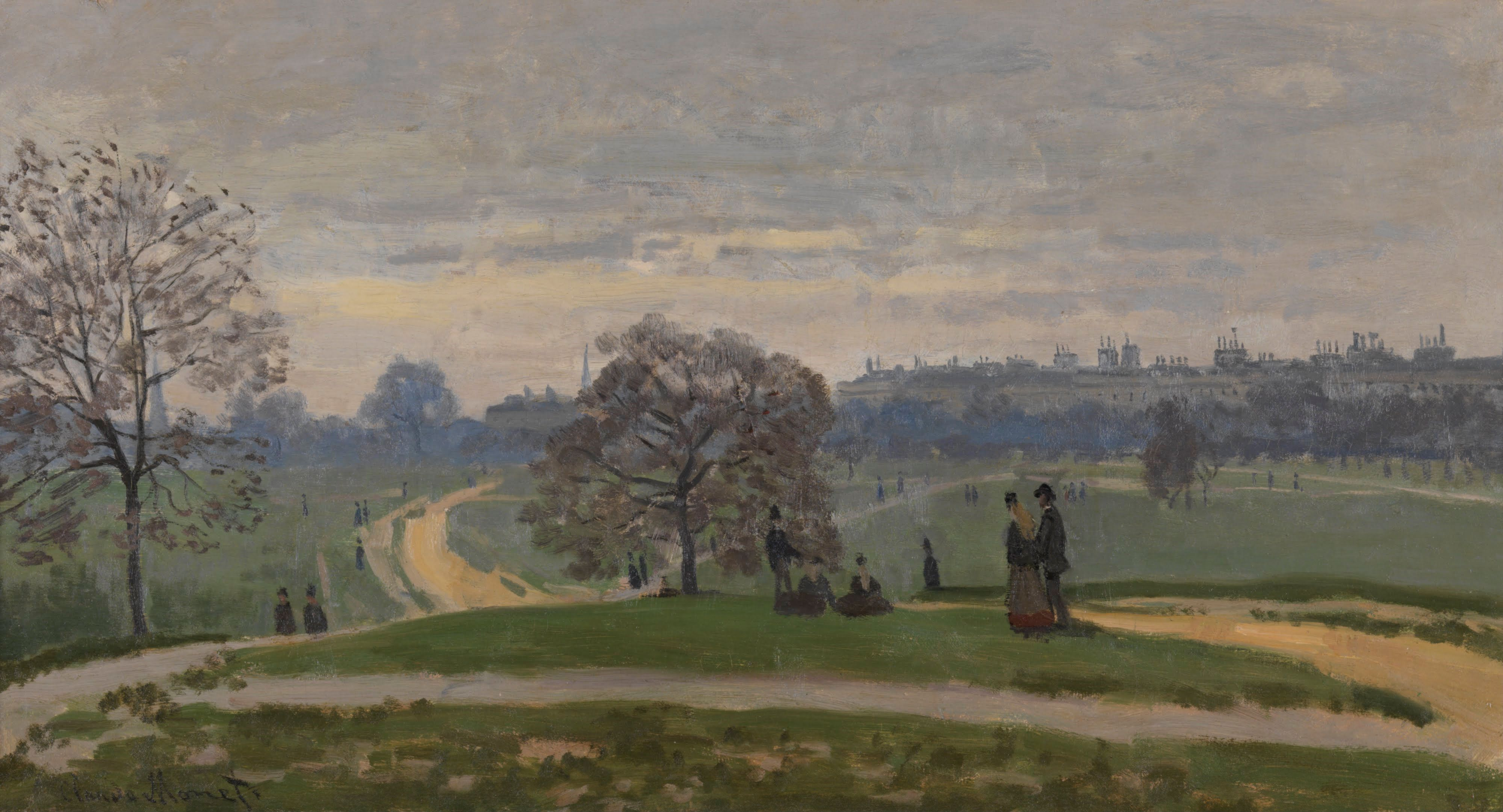
Claude Monet, Hyde Park (1871)

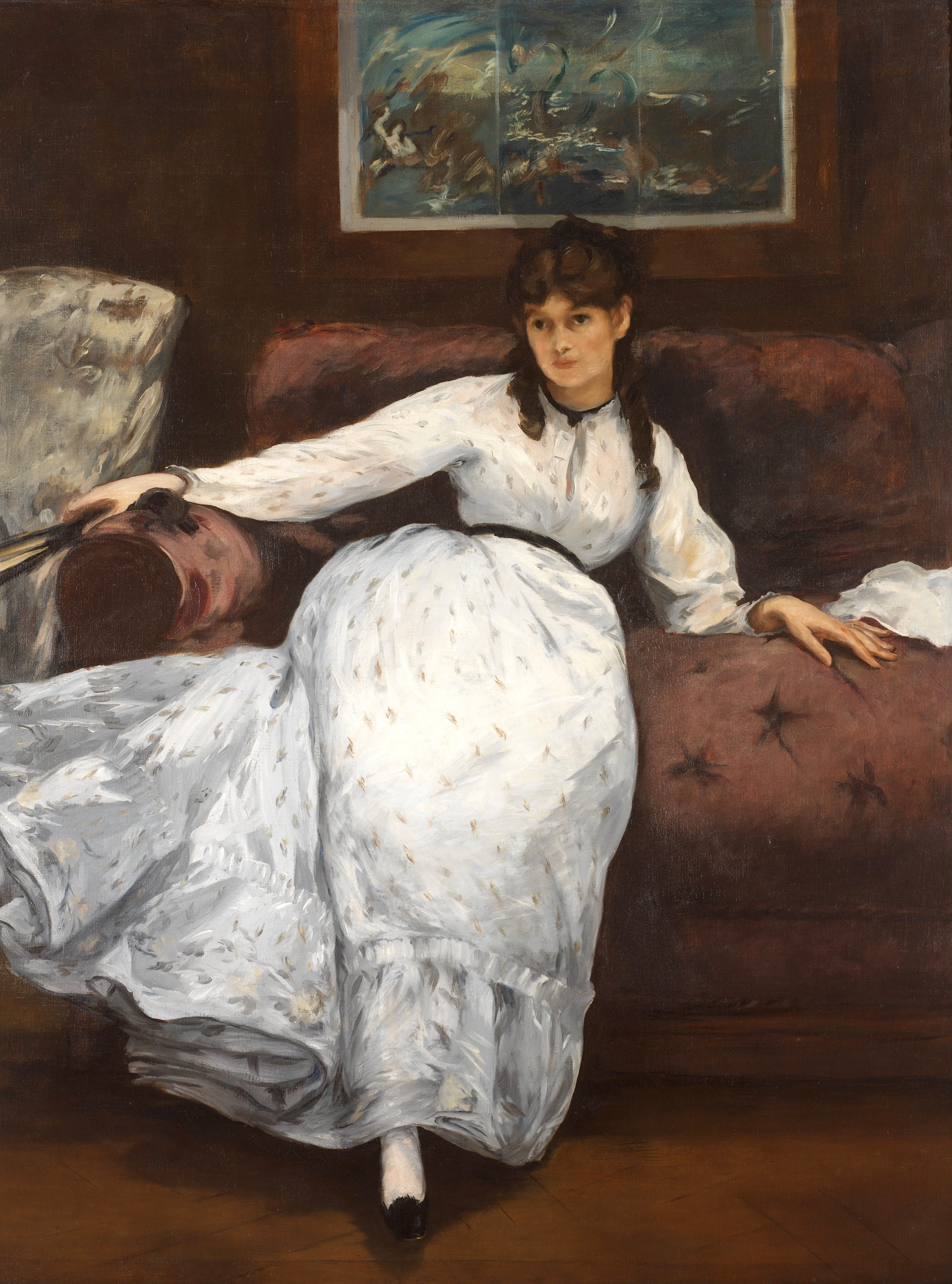
Manet, Repose (c. 1871)

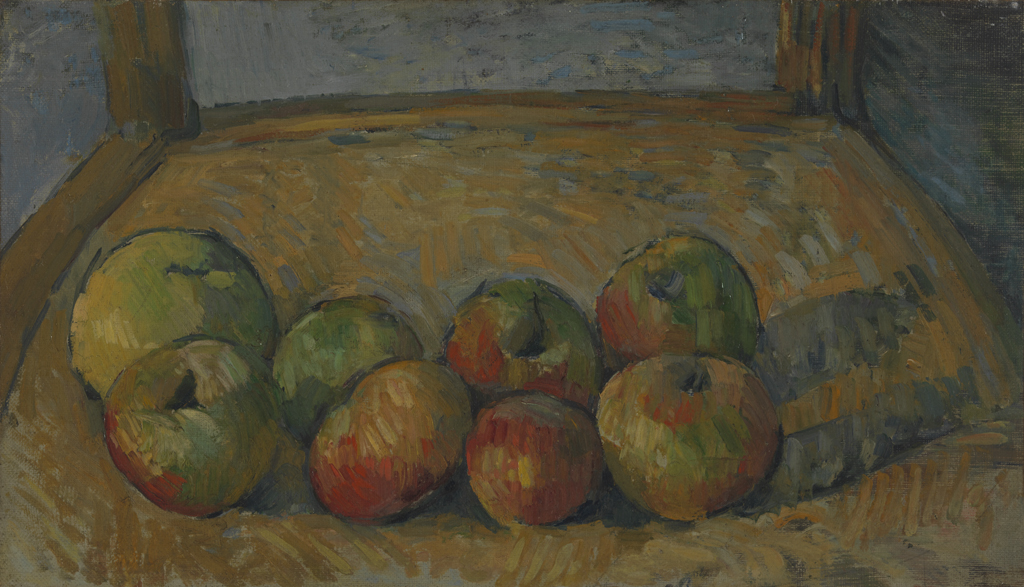
Cézanne, Still Life with Apples (c. 1878)

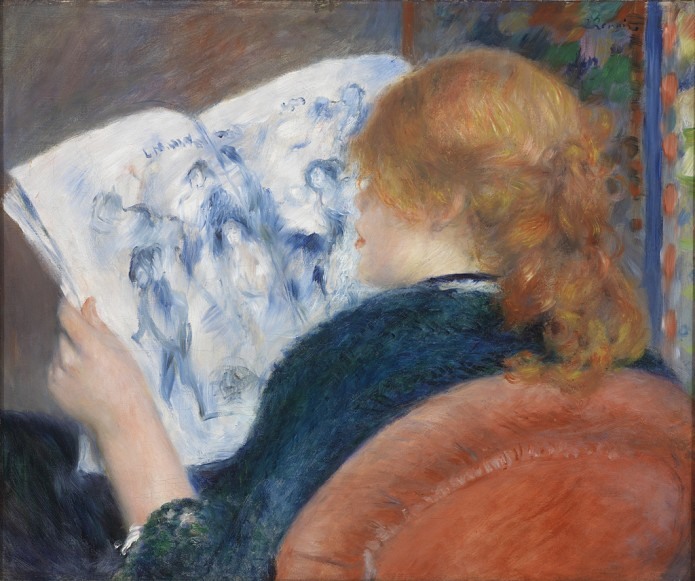
Renoir, Young Woman Reading an Illustrated Journal (c. 1880)

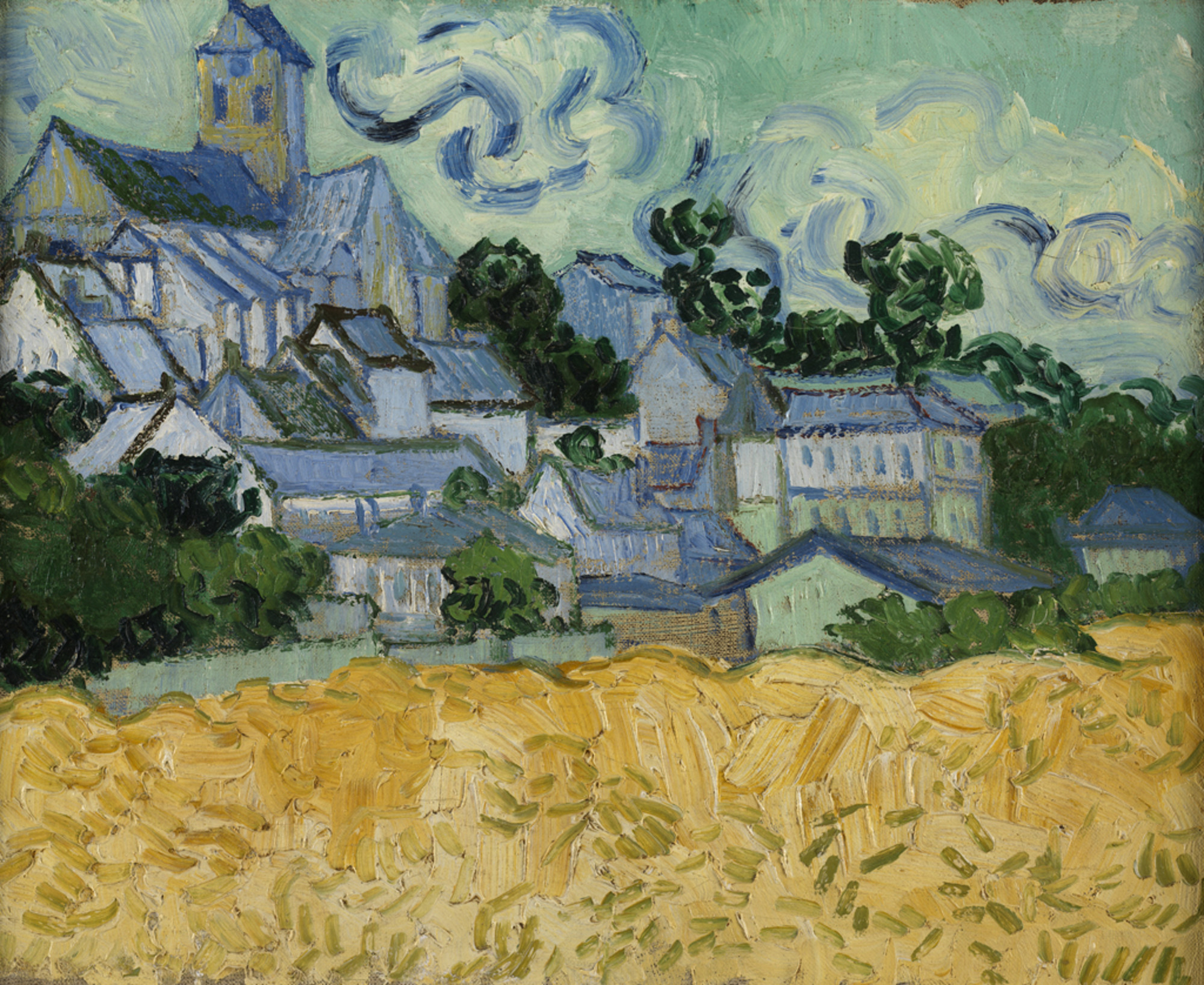
Vincent van Gogh, View of Auvers with Church (1890)

=== Prints, drawings, and photographs ===
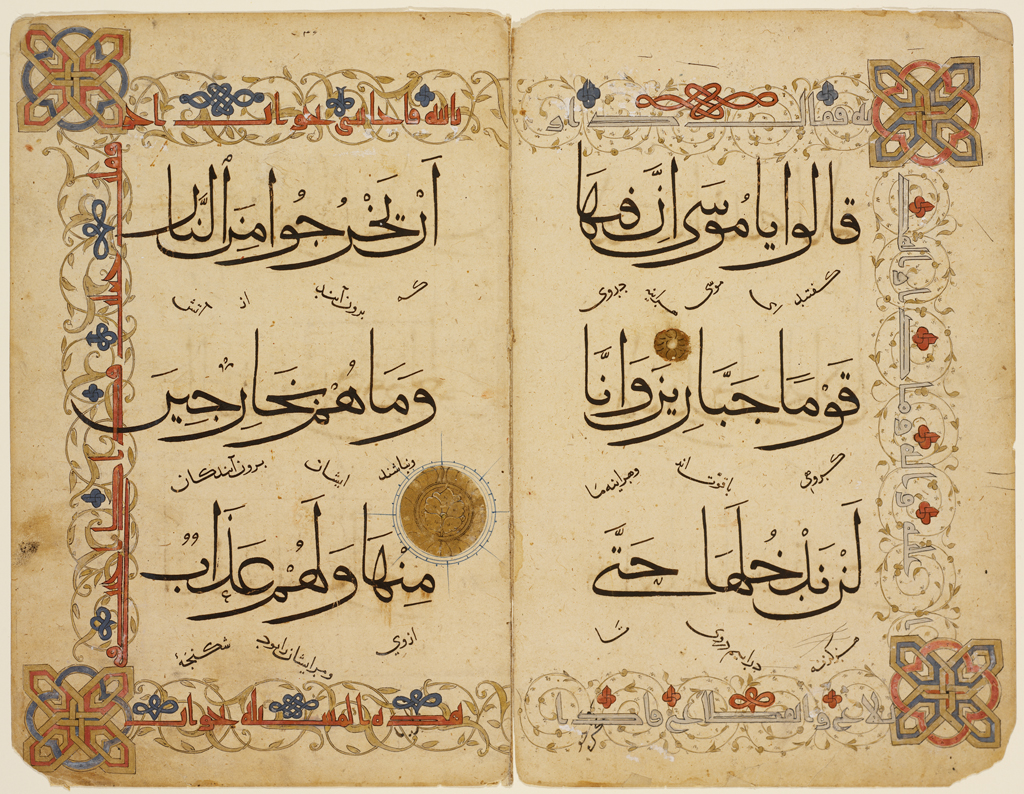
14th century Anatolian Qur'an manuscript

The Prints, Drawings, and Photographs collection comprises more than 25,000 works dating from the 15th century to the present. The holdings include a large group of Old Master engravings and etchings, and particular strengths in prints and drawings of 18th-century Italy, 19th-century France, and 19th- and 20th-century America. The department also holds one of the largest collections of late 18th- and early 19th-century British watercolors in the United States, featuring work by J. M. W. Turner, George Chinnery, John Sell Cotman, William Blake, and Thomas Rowlandson. The collection of French prints and drawings includes work by Nicolas Poussin, Hubert Robert, Jean-Auguste-Dominique Ingres, Édouard Manet, Claude Monet, Honoré Daumier, Vincent van Gogh, Paul Cézanne, Edgar Degas, Pablo Picasso, and others.

Notable in the collection of American watercolors and drawings are works by Benjamin West, Mary Cassatt, Thomas Eakins, Eastman Johnson, Winslow Homer, Maurice Prendergast, and Maxfield Parrish. Among the important 20th-century artists represented in the collection are Franz Kline, James Rosenquist, Helen Frankenthaler, Robert Motherwell, Jennifer Bartlett, Eric Fischl, Wayne Thiebaud, Kara Walker, and Francesco Clemente. Both the Nancy Sayles Day Collection of Modern Latin American Art and the Richard Brown Baker collection of contemporary British art have depth in works on paper.

The history of the art of the book is represented, in one of its earliest forms, by the Hypnerotomachia Poliphili (1499), a masterpiece of Renaissance illumination. In later centuries, work by masters of printing and illustration provides a link between the earliest books and 20th-century "artists books" that push limits and challenge traditional interpretations of the form. Contemporary works on paper in all media are the fastest growing segment of the collection.

An overview of the history of photography is provided by 5,000 photographs, among them significant works by Gustave Le Gray, Julia Margaret Cameron, Nadar, Frederick Sommer, Carrie Mae Weems, and the past RISD professors Aaron Siskind and Harry Callahan. The department also oversees the Minskoff Center for Prints, Drawings, and Photographs, which is open to students, faculty, and researchers.

== Gelman Student Exhibitions Gallery ==
The Gelman Student Exhibitions Gallery and the Dryfoos Gallery for New Media are located on the second floor of the Chace Center at 20 North Main Street, Providence, Rhode Island. The galleries make student work accessible to visitors to the RISD Museum. All students — undergraduates and graduates in any major — may submit individual or team proposals for group exhibitions in either gallery. The director of campus exhibitions (separate from the RISD Museum) reviews proposals alongside an oversight committee that includes representatives from the Student Gallery Board. Once the concept for an exhibition is approved, curators work with gallery staff to select the work, design the exhibition, prepare supporting written material, hang the show, publicize it, and plan the opening.
