= Al and Barbara Garvey =

American artist and dance couple

- Citizenship: American
- Known for: Painting; printmaking; producing patterns for sewing; woodworking; hot tub culture; tango dancing

Al and Barbara Garvey are an American artist and tango dancing couple known for catalyzing hot tub culture in California in 1966. While living in Fairfax in Marin County, California, the Garveys built their own hot tub in which they could soak with friends. The practice spread into a cultural phenomenon throughout the 1970s and 1980s.

The Garveys are both artists, with Al known as a painter, screen printer and woodworker. In 1972, Al was a founding member of the Baulines Craft Guild, a society of master artists willing to teach apprentices. His artistic doors and doorways have brought him praise. Barbara collaborated with Al on a screen printing commission titled We Are the Wall Itself in 1974. Barbara co-founded Folkwear Patterns with two other women in 1976, which continued as a pattern-making company under new ownership.

In the 1990s, the Garveys began to teach tango dancing in the San Francisco Bay Area, after leading a resurgence of interest in tango dancing inspired by the musical Tango Argentino. In 2004, the Garveys moved to Puerto Vallarta in Mexico and continued to build a tango community and create art.

== Personal lives ==
Albert Garvey was born in Chicago on January 23, 1932. His Jewish parents were Harry and Marion Garvey. A few years later, his sister Myrna was born. In the 1940 census the Garvey family was listed as living in Chicago's Hyde Park neighborhood near Washington Park. Following this, Al's sister Gilda was born. Garvey studied a broad range of art at the Los Angeles County Art Institute. Barbara Sue Harman was born November 10, 1934, in Champaign, Illinois. The Harmans were not Jewish but Barbara's mother's maiden name was Rosenblatt, a surname of German and Jewish origin. She graduated from Oberlin College in Ohio.

Al met Barbara at the Old Town School of Folk Music in Chicago in 1958, where they were learning folk dancing. They married on May 31, 1959, then spent a year in the Montmartre district of Paris. In the same manner as Maurice Utrillo 50 years earlier, Al set up a painting easel at Place du Tertre to paint city scenes. Returning to the US, the two drove from Chicago to California in their 1953 Chevrolet and rebuilt a houseboat in Sausalito in Marin County north of San Francisco where they lived in a community of bohemian artists. Their first daughter, Megan, was born in San Francisco in 1961.

In 1963, the Garveys moved to Mallorca, Spain. In the mountain village of Fornalutx, they rebuilt a ruined stone mill into a multi-level home and occupied it from 1963 to 1965, making a living by odd jobs and selling Al's paintings. The couple's second daughter, Samantha, was born in Palma de Mallorca in 1964. Seeing little future raising a family in Franco's Spain, the Garveys moved back to Sausalito in 1965, but the houseboat arrangement was growing more commercial so they shifted in July 1966 to a house on Scenic Road in Fairfax, California, where they lived for almost 40 years.

Al said that thriving as artists in Marin County in the 1960s and 1970s was very productive: "we lived a truly elegant life with our own home and practically no money. I was able to work three days a week as a carpenter doing really far-out things and devote the rest of the time to my art habit." He said that he and Barbara were carefree "flower children" who put their trust in providence.

The Garveys moved to Puerto Vallarta in 2004, and continued to create art and to teach tango dancing.

== Art ==
=== Printmaking ===
Al Garvey's first years of art were in the medium of oil painting, but in the 1960s he began to experiment with screen printing. In April 1963, the first cover of the alternative weekly newspaper Pacific Sun was Al's work: the head of a rooster rendered as a serigraph.

Al helped architect/artist William "Bill" Kirsch re-organize the Sausalito Art Festival as an artist-run event in 1965 and 1966, after the Sausalito Chamber of Commerce stopped hosting it. Garvey showed his paintings and prints at the festival every year, and he served as director of the festival in 1968, the year that influential artist Jean Varda supplied the overall design of the festival. In 1967, Al wrote about Varda and other houseboat artist residents in Architectural Forum, an article titled "The Houseboats of Sausalito," which described the creative and artistic building styles of the bohemian community of houseboat dwellers.

Al was commissioned in 1974 by the Judah L. Magnes Museum to create a series of images depicting modern Israel. The Garveys collaborated on the project, though it was listed under Al's name alone. The resulting work, We Are the Wall Itself, took the form of 24 color silkscreen prints. To inspire the project, Barbara Garvey pored through 5,000 years of Jewish writings to select 24 quotations. For raw material, the Garveys drew from snapshots taken during their visit to Israel in 1960 as well as new photos taken in 1974 specifically for the project; more than a thousand photos in all. Photos were altered in the darkroom and retouched by hand to create the 24 images of the series. The museum exhibited this project for seven weeks in 1974–1975, and again from September 2013 to June 2014. Curator Francesco Spagnolo wrote that "Garvey's eye seized Israel's diversity through the lenses of a then popular form of Pop Art (screen printing), distant from the tropes that had until then marked its representation in America and elsewhere. Rather than glorifying military might, agricultural advancements, and archeological treasures, these images offer a direct appreciation for the daily life of a developing country in which multiple cultures continually negotiated their forms of coexistence".

=== Woodworking ===
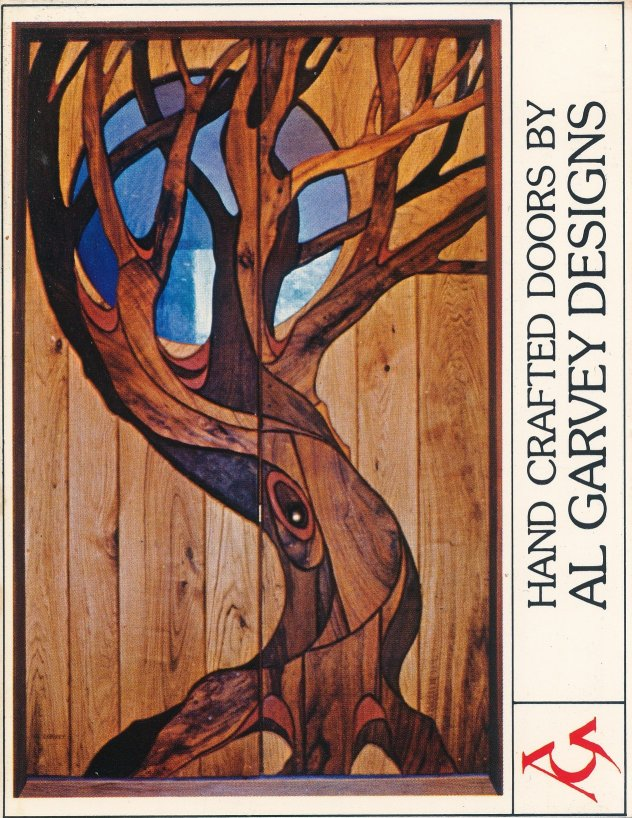
Al Garvey's business flyer for Door/Ways

Al Garvey is a woodworker known for his doorways (doors and door frames), sold under his Door/Ways trademark. His work was described as "intricate and sensuous". He not only formed the wood of his doors but he fabricated the brass and bronze hardware. Al fashioned a Dutch door made of stained glass and a combination of Acacia koa and cedar driftwood; this was later shown at the San Francisco Museum of Modern Art in the 1999–2000 retrospective exhibit titled Far Out: Bay Area Design 1967–73, alongside other hippie-era artworks such as Janis Joplin's psychedelic Porsche 356.

Al built himself an art studio at his house in Fairfax by reclaiming the old-growth redwood planks from a very large wine barrel that had been discarded next to a road in Sonoma. He said that the new studio smelled like wine for five years afterward. Inside the home, he built a fireplace of Mexican river stone with a relief sculpture above it that he made from fallen branches of Pacific madrone wood. The Garveys were influenced by Jean Varda, their Sausalito houseboat neighbor, who advocated an organic style of art that revealed "the hand of man."

Al was a founding member of Arthur Carpenter's Bolinas Craft Guild in 1972, formed to connect apprentices with master craftsmen. Under the auspices of the guild, Al taught Germany-born sculptor Florian Roeper in 2003–2004 during a period when Roeper was working on various sculptures and Al was creating a notable door in the Mission district of San Francisco. When Al started woodworking, he took a long hiatus from painting.

=== Painting ===
Al began painting in the late 1950s, especially in Paris and Mallorca, but he stopped when his California woodworking projects took all the available space in his studio. He returned again to painting after his 2004 move to Mexico. He showed 16 of his tango-inspired oil paintings in a solo exhibition titled "Come Dance With Me" at Galería Uno in Puerto Vallarta in December 2018.

== Folkwear Patterns ==
Barbara Garvey enjoyed sewing her own clothing, and she exchanged ideas with clothing designer Laurel Burch who wove an intricate dress for Barbara to wear. Two other sewing friends were Ann Wainwright and Alexandra Jacopetti Hart, who were interested in classic costumes of the world. In 1976, Wainwright, Jacopetti Hart and Garvey co-founded Folkwear Patterns to sell sewing patterns for folk dancing outfits, ethnic costumes and historic, creative clothing to show personal flair. Barbara served a term as president of the venture. The three founders sold Folkwear in the mid-1980s to Taunton Press. As of 2017, Molly Hamilton owned the company, and began digitizing the catalog and expanded the operation to include retail clothing sales.

== Hot tub culture ==
In 1966 while they were living in Sausalito, the Garveys were invited by mutual friends to the home of Charlotte and Charles "Tad" Irvine in Stinson Beach. Tad had been in Japan during the occupation, and he brought back an appreciation of the Japanese outdoor bath (furo). Unlike the Japanese, the Irvines were prudish regarding who could use the tub, restricting its use to only one married couple at a time, no unmarried couples, and no larger groups. The Garveys were keen on the tub but not the restrictions. Al decided to build his own hot tub, but first he needed a house with sufficient space. The Garveys found a run-down 1915 house for a purchase price of $30,000 on Scenic Road in Fairfax, next to the old right-of-way of the Fairfax Manor Funicular (1913). Before moving in, Al commissioned a custom redwood tub with submerged benches built to be four feet in diameter and deep enough for an adult to stand up in the center. The Garveys built a wooden deck in the branches of an expansive pine tree in their yard, the deck large enough and strong enough to hold the hot tub, a handful of guests, and a changing room with pegs to hang clothing. Bathers climbed a ladder to get up to the deck; the ladder was salvaged from an abandoned, half-sunk wooden tug boat near Marinship. Al rigged an old water heater to supply hot water; he said, "There was no idea of a filter system or recirculation system. It was as simple as possible." Barbara said, "We decided to make the hot tub a social enterprise and started throwing parties."

Hundreds of people used the Garveys' "Japanese bath" in the second half of 1966. The Garveys would entertain dinner guests, or conduct art classes, or throw a party, and afterward, many of the guests would shed their clothes and dip in the hot tub. Al said, "At that time it was a party thing with couples, single people, everybody taking off all their clothes, having great conversation and listening to great music. It was not sexual but it was extremely sensual." Among the bathers were jazz musician John Handy, architect Roger Somers (known for Druid Heights) and sex worker/feminist Margo St. James. Al was asked to make hot tubs for some of his guests, and the idea caught on. Within a few years Marin County supported a half dozen hot tub builders including Redwood Hot Tubs in Mill Valley, sometimes making hot tubs large enough for 12 people.

== Tango dancing ==
The Garveys have enjoyed dancing together since the first time they met. Throughout the 1970s, the Garveys hosted Greek folk dancing parties at their home on Friday evenings, with many of the dancers staying to enjoy the hot tub. They participated in vintage dance events held by the Art Deco Society of California, of which they were members. Barbara Garvey attended the musical Tango Argentino when she was in New York on business in 1985, and she phoned Al to say, "I've just seen what we're going to do the rest of our lives." In 1986 they saw the musical when it traveled to San Francisco, and then they threw their own tango dance party, in the flamboyant style of stage tango. In 1987 after encountering a Buenos Aires milonga (dance event) where everyone was dancing in the more subdued and intimate salon style, and after speaking to veteran dancer Fino Ribeira about the close interpersonal connection offered by this style, the Garveys were interested in learning more about salon tango, a style of social dancing in which the dance steps are improvised on the spot rather than choreographed ahead of time. The Garveys studied salon tango with protegés of Argentine expatriate Orlando Paiva who was promoting social tango in Los Angeles. In 1991 the Garveys brought dancers Nito García and Elba Sottile to California to perform and conduct classes. Barbara began to keep track of social tango events happening around the San Francisco Bay Area, and she organized a mailing list of milongas to distribute among aficionados. The Garveys visited Buenos Aires many times to observe and participate in authentic tango dancing, and in April 1994 they were invited to appear on the Argentine television program Venga a Bailar to show their tango dancing prowess. In 1995 the Garveys co-founded the non-profit Bay Area Argentine Tango Association and published B.A. Gotan, a newsletter to promote tango in Northern California. The Fairfax Milonga had been started by fellow Fairfax residents Jean and Charlie Stewart in 1994, then in 1999 the Garveys began hosting the monthly event. The Garveys occasionally taught tango elsewhere, for instance at San Francisco's Broadway Studios Milonga during its heyday in 1996–2002.

The Garveys have been cited as making the San Francisco Bay Area into the North American "capitol" of tango. Barbara Garvey wrote about tango in 1993 in Smithsonian magazine, comparing three tango dance styles to three phases of marriage: "The American tango is like the beginning of a love affair, when you're both very romantic and on your best behaviour. The Argentine tango is when you're in the heat of things and all kinds of emotions are flying: passion, anger, humour. The international tango is like the end of the marriage, when you're staying together for the sake of the children." The Garveys taught tango dance classes throughout the 1990s and after they moved to Puerto Vallarta in 2004, they continued teaching there. Tango images fill many of Al's 21st century paintings.
