= Stewart Wurtz =

Stewart Wurtz is a studio furniture maker based in Seattle. He has exhibited locally in the Pacific Northwest and nationally at a variety of galleries and museums.

Stewart Wurtz was born and raised in Maine. He worked for Thomas Moser Cabinetmakers before he started architecture school at the Boston Architectural Center. After a year or so in architecture school, he enrolled at Boston University in the Program in Artisanry headed furniture maker Jere Osgood. Wurtz earned his B.F.A. in Furniture Design in 1984. Two years later Wurtz moved to Seattle, Washington and opened a studio to design and build custom furniture.

Wurtz has exhibited at Pritam & Eames in East Hampton, NY, and in Maine, Pennsylvania, California, and Washington. Wurtz is a member of Northwest Woodworkers Gallery (formerly Northwest Fine Woodworking).
