= Emi Ozawa =

Japanese artist (born 1962)

- Born: 1962 (age 63–64); Tokyo, Japan
- Education: Joshibi University of Art and Design, Tokyo University of the Arts, University of the Arts
- Alma mater: Rhode Island School of Design

Emi Ozawa (born 1962) is a Japanese-born American visual artist, sculptor, and furniture designer. She is known for her woodworking that is also interactive sculpture, which she started creating in the early 1980s. Originally from Tokyo, Ozawa lives and works in Albuquerque, New Mexico.

== Biography ==
Emi Ozawa was born in 1962 in Tokyo, Japan. Her father was an accountant and her mother was a stay-at-home mother; they encouraged her at a young age to pursue art.

Ozawa attended Joshibi University of Art and Design, followed by study in 1985 at the Tokyo University of the Arts. After two years she transferred as an exchange student to the University of the Arts in Philadelphia to study woodworking. She later earned an MFA degree in furniture design from the Rhode Island School of Design. She had studied furniture design under Michael Hurwitz, Alphonse Mattia and Rosanne Somerson.

Ozawa creates painted wood wall sculptures that optically shift when viewed from different perspectives. These wall paintings are constructed from many pieces of wood that are screwed together to construct a multi-dimensional surface. Color is strategically arranged to create compositions that shift when viewed from different perspectives. Her sophisticated surface application and meticulous design reveal an emphasis on craftsmanship. Her work is associated with constructivism and minimalism.
