= Northwest Woodworkers Gallery =

Coordinates: 47.6120°N 122.3445°W

Northwest Woodworkers Gallery (formerly Northwest Gallery of Fine Woodworking) in downtown Seattle, is the oldest and largest woodworking cooperative in the United States. Started in 1980 in the Pioneer Square neighborhood by a small group of studio furniture craftsmen, the gallery has grown and fostered the resurgence of the Northwest Crafts movement. The co-op includes notable master woodworkers such as Evert Sodergren and Stewart Wurtz. The Northwest Woodworkers gallery moved to the 2111 1st Ave in the Belltown neighborhood in 2012. The gallery currently represents more than 200 woodworkers, including 27 members.
