= Evert Sodergren =

Furniture maker based in Seattle, Washington, USA

Evert Sodergren (July 19, 1920 – June 8, 2013) was a leading studio furniture maker based in Seattle. He taught for many years in the School of Art at the University of Washington.

Evert Sodergren was born and raised in Seattle. He is a fourth generation woodworker in his family. At age 15, he started working in his father's furniture shop and learned the basics of furniture making and cabinetry. After high school he took evening classes in production drafting and worked as a drafter during World War II. In 1947, when his father returned to Sweden, Sodergren continued the business on his own.

Sodergren was very interested in the modern furniture being made in Scandinavia in the 1940s and 1950s, and turned away from the historical modes his father had followed. Sodergren was influenced by the work of Hans Wegner, Bruno Mathsson, Finn Juhl, and George Nelson. In the 1950s his work began to be exhibited in the Pacific Northwest and then across the United States.

Sodergren joined the faculty of the School of Art at the University of Washington in 1951, and taught furniture for nearly 30 years.

Sodergren's influence and example helped shape the studio furniture movement in the Pacific Northwest. He was an early participant in the development of Seattle's Northwest Gallery of Fine Woodworking (which continues today as Northwest Woodworkers Gallery).
