= Rosanne Somerson =

American woodworker, former President of Rhode Island School of Design

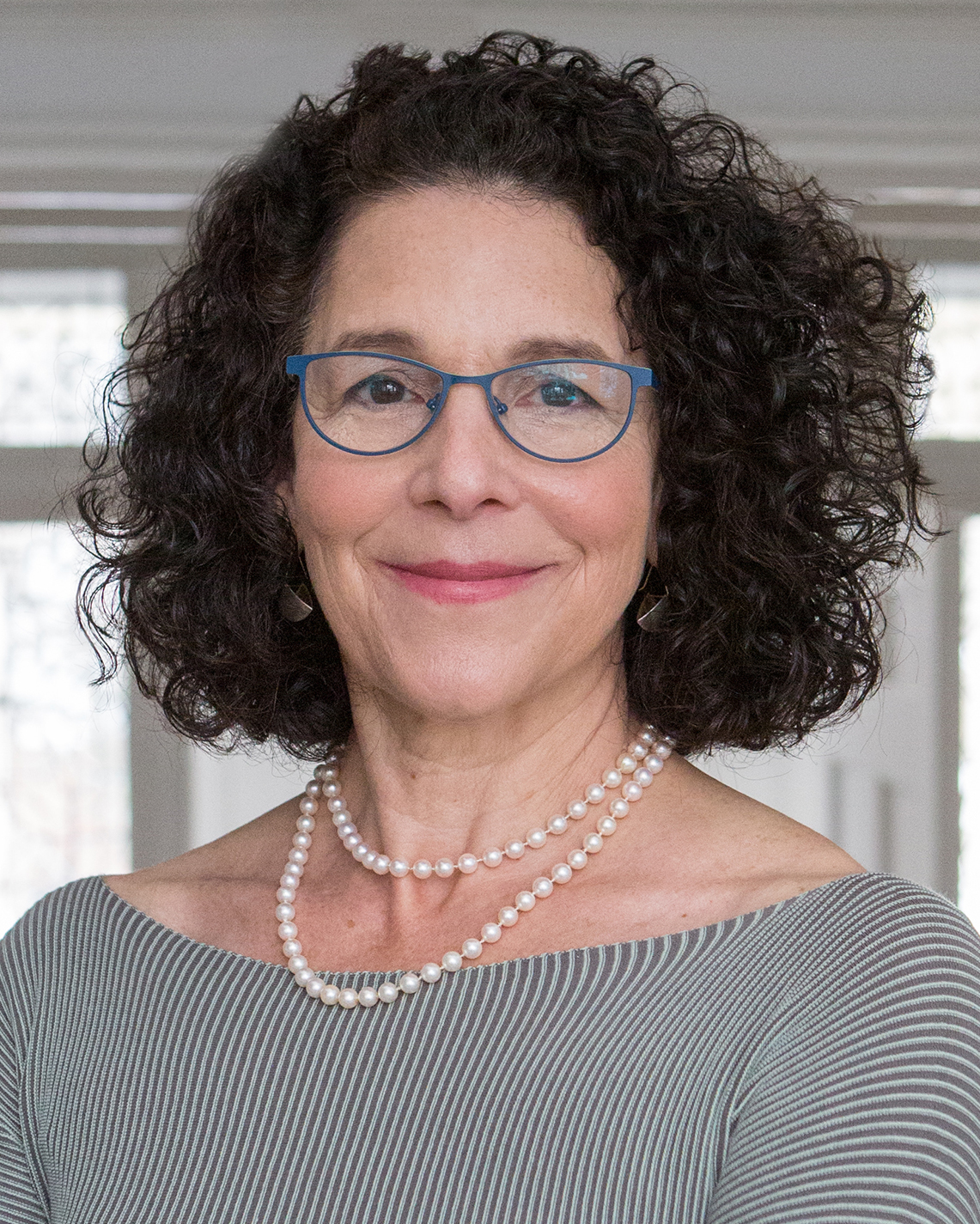

17th President of the Rhode Island School of Design
- In office Interim: January 1, 2014 – February 18, 2015; February 18, 2015 – June 30, 2021
- Preceded by: John Maeda
- Succeeded by: Dave Proulx

Personal details
- Born: June 21, 1954 (age 72) Philadelphia, Pennsylvania, U.S.
- Education: Rhode Island School of Design
- Profession: Woodworker, Furniture Designer, University President

Rosanne Somerson (born June 21, 1954) is an American-born woodworker, furniture designer/maker, educator, and former President of Rhode Island School of Design (RISD). An artist connected with the early years of the Studio Furniture, her work and career have been influential to the field.

== Early life ==
In an interview on Amy Devers' podcast Clever, Somerson discusses her upbringing and how it affected the path she took. She attempted to join a woodworking/shop class in middle school, but wasn't allowed to participate and faced repercussions for asking. Somerson also made most of her clothes throughout high school. She attributes this to her reliance on hand-me-downs, along with her want to have unique clothes that she couldn't otherwise afford.

== Education and early career ==
Born in Philadelphia, Pennsylvania, she began her undergraduate degree at Rhode Island School of Design (RISD) in photography, but switched her focus, and received her B.F.A. degree in Industrial Design in 1976. During this time of transition, she took a semester off of her studies at RISD to attend full-time furniture making workshops at Peter's Valley Craftsmen (Peter's Valley School of Craft). After graduation, Somerson worked as a correspondent for Fine Woodworking magazine. She also assisted for photography with her former professor and mentor Tage Frid's three-part book series "Tage Frid Teaches Woodworking" published by Taunton Press (1996).

== Academic career ==
She taught woodworking with the Harvard Extension School from 1977 to 1978, and at the Boston Architectural Center in 1981. Somerson joined the Rhode Island School of Design faculty in 1985. Starting in 1985, Somerson ran the M.F.A. Graduate Program in Furniture Design and she co-founded the creation of the Furniture Design department in 1995. She served as RISD's interim associate provost for Academic Affairs from 2005 to 2007, as interim provost from 2011 to 2012, as provost from 2012 to 2013 and as interim president from 2014 to 2015. The RISD Board of Trustees appointed her the college's 17th president on February 18, 2015.

After being appointed president of the university in February 2015, Somerson appointed Pradeep Sharma to be Provost. Somerson's first speaking engagements as president came in the spring at the National Art Education Association Annual Convention and at South By Southwest EDU in 2015, where she discussed the impact of critical making. In April, 44 technicians at the college went on strike, but the three-day job action concluded with the ratification of their contract. In May, the work of Apparel Design seniors was showcased in New York City for the first time at RISD Backstudio. Somerson's first semester as president concluded with filmmaker John Waters delivering the college's commencement address. His remarks went viral and have been turned into a book.

In the fall of 2015, Somerson spoke at the Nantucket Project, the Drucker Forum in Vienna and Art Basel Miami Beach. The three-year renovation of RISD's Illustration Studies Building was completed and an opening ceremony was held as part of the college's annual parent and alumni weekend. Somerson was inaugurated as the seventeenth president of RISD in October 2015.

In July 2020, after the outbreak of COVID-19 and the subsequent closure of the RISD campus, Somerson began negotiations with the RISD faculty union over the avoidance of possible layoffs by suggesting cost-cutting measures. The part-time faculty union, the National Education Association rejected the initial proposal.

During the beginning of her sixth year as RISD's president, Somerson announced her plans for retiring on June 30, 2021. In retirement, Somerson plans on taking a sabbatical and will take on the role of President Emerita.

== Artistic practice ==
Somerson has maintained a full-time professional studio practice, Rosanne Somerson Furniture, since 1979 designing and building furniture for exhibition and by commission. Her current studio is located in Fall River, Massachusetts within Smokestack Studios. Somerson is known primarily for one-of-a-kind and custom work, but is also a partner in DEZCO, LLC, a small-scale production furniture company which focuses on environmentally-responsible and design-conscious production furniture.

Somerson, along with Wendy Maruyama, Kristina Madsen, and Gail Fredell, was one of the first women to break into the field of Studio Furniture: a field that mixes art, craft, sculpture, and furniture design. In these early years, the women in this field responded to the hyper-technical work of their male counterparts by building furniture with complex joinery and technically advanced bent wood laminations. This was done to "prove themselves" and "gain acceptance" into this male-dominated field. In the mid-80's, Somerson began to define her aesthetic style and to put personal expression into her work. Her focus became functional and timeless pieces using long-standing furniture making traditions to ensure decades of use. She started to create smaller works that valued function as well as emotional content; pieces that demanded an intimate relationship with the viewer. Through the use of subtle color, upholstery, and graphic elements, her work stood out in the field that was quickly turning towards the era's trends of bright-colors and abstraction.

As her work and career progressed, Somerson's work narrowed focus on the emotional experience of furniture. Her 1992 piece titled "Botanical Reading Couch" invites viewers to lie back in the piece and recollect a familiar couch from home or from their childhood. This work in particular is less a self-expression as an artist but instead a concern for the emotional and physical needs of the user. The intimate and interactive nature of furniture as a medium allowed her to evoke memories and emotions from the viewer. In a 1991 artist statement, Somerson writes "My hope is to help the viewer find her or her own place of emotive satisfaction, coaxed and guided by the furniture;s utility in both its obvious and more subtle functions."

Somerson's work has been included in the following museum collections: Smithsonian American Art Museum; Renwick Collection, National Museum of American Art, Washington, DC; Brockton Art Museum, Fuller Memorial (Brockton, MA); Museum of Fine Arts, Boston; Yale University Art Gallery; RISD Museum, at Rhode Island School of Design; Huntsville Museum of Art, in Huntsville, Alabama; and Smith College Museum of Art.

== Awards and distinctions ==
- 2012 Award of Distinction for Lifetime Achievement, The Furniture Society
- 2009 Named Fellow, American Craft Council, New York, New York
- 2002 National Distinguished Educator Award, James Renwick Alliance, Smithsonian Institution, Washington, DC
- 2001 First Place, Centennial Arts & Crafts Exhibition, Providence Art Club, Providence, Rhode Island
- 1996, 1995, 1990 Faculty Development Grant, RISD
- 1988 Visual Artist Fellowship, National Endowment for the Arts
- 1988 Finalist in Crafts, Massachusetts Arts Fellowship
- 1987 Grand Prize, American Craft Awards Competition, The Guild, also Westport Arts Council Grant
- 1984 Visual Artist Fellowship, National Endowment for the Arts
- 1984 WBZ Arts Grant, Fund for the Arts
- 1984 New Works Grant, Mass Council on Arts & Humanities to Brockton Art Museum
- 1983 Award of Outstanding Achievement, Women in Design International Competition
- 1983 Artist Residency, Artpark, Village of Lewiston, New York
- 1979 Honorable Mention, Containers, Danforth Museum, Framingham, Massachusetts
- 1976 First Place, New England Winner Student Design Competition
- 1975 First Place, New England Regional Winner, "NHFL Craft/Design Competition"
- 1974 Scholarship, Edinburgh Arts '74, Completed Traditional Coopering Apprenticeship, Markinch Distillery, Scotland

== Books ==
- Somerson, Rosanne; Hermano, Mara (2013). The Art of Critical Making. Foreword by John Maeda. Wiley. ISBN 978-1-118-51786-4.

== Works ==
Title	Date	Dimension (inches)	Classification	Link to work
Small Table with Leaves	Unknown	17 x 15 x 15	table	The Furniture Society
Tall Black Chair	1990	61.5 x 21 x 20	Chair	RISD Museum
Botanical Reading Couch	1992	39 x 75.625 x 32.75	Couch	Smithsonian American Art Museum
When She Was Bad...	1995	23.75 x 21 x 6.75	Cabinet	Smithsonian American Art Museum
Father Child Cabinet	1995	72.5 x 24 x 15.5	Cabinet	American Craft Council
Child Trophy	1998	13.5 x 8.75 x 8.75	Sculpture/Vessel	NetWorks Rhode Island
Wrapped	2011	33.5 x 42.375 x 9.75	Table	NetWorks Rhode Island

== See also ==
- List of presidents of the Rhode Island School of Design
