= James Krenov =

American furniture maker

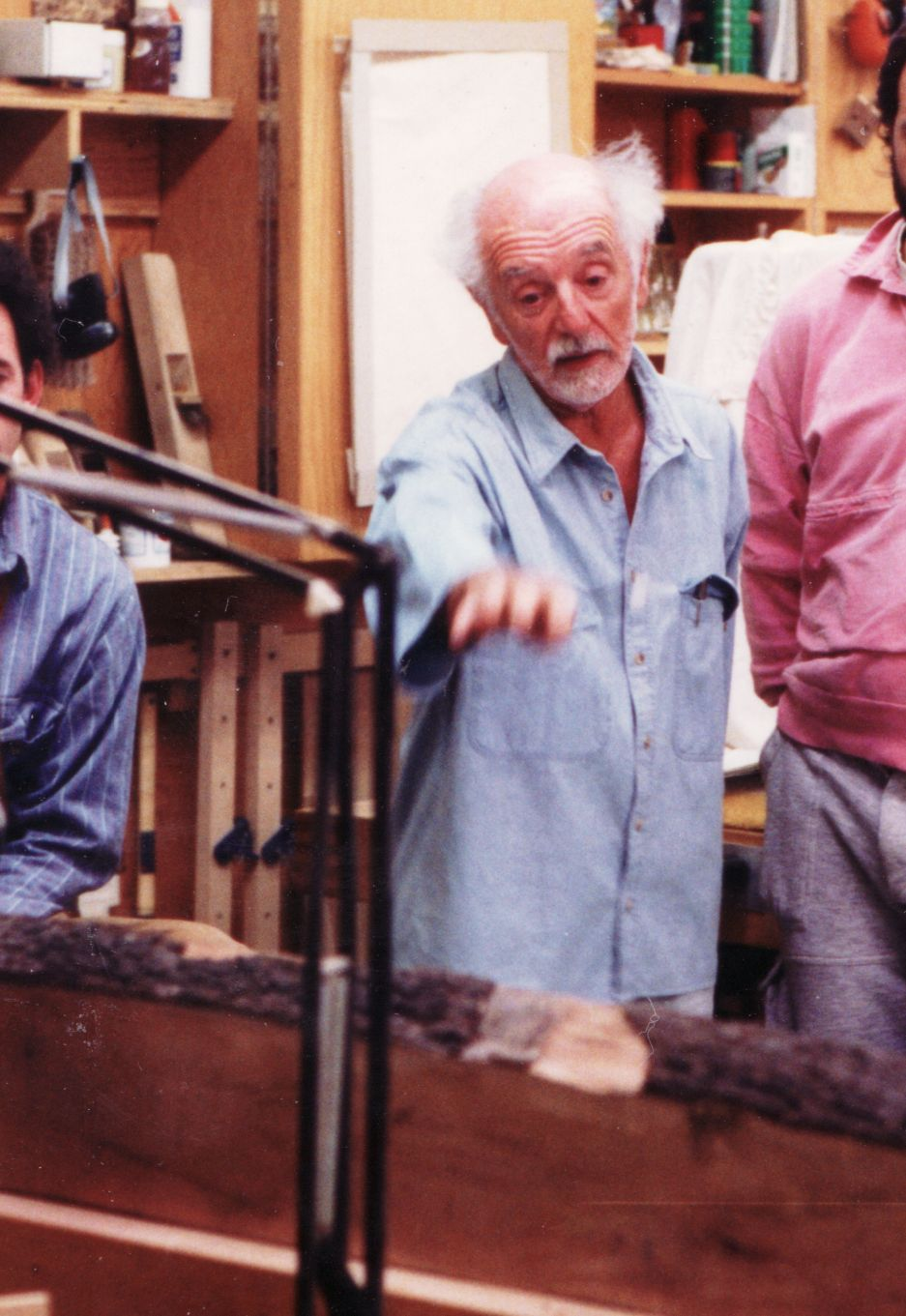
James Krenov teaching in his school, 1990

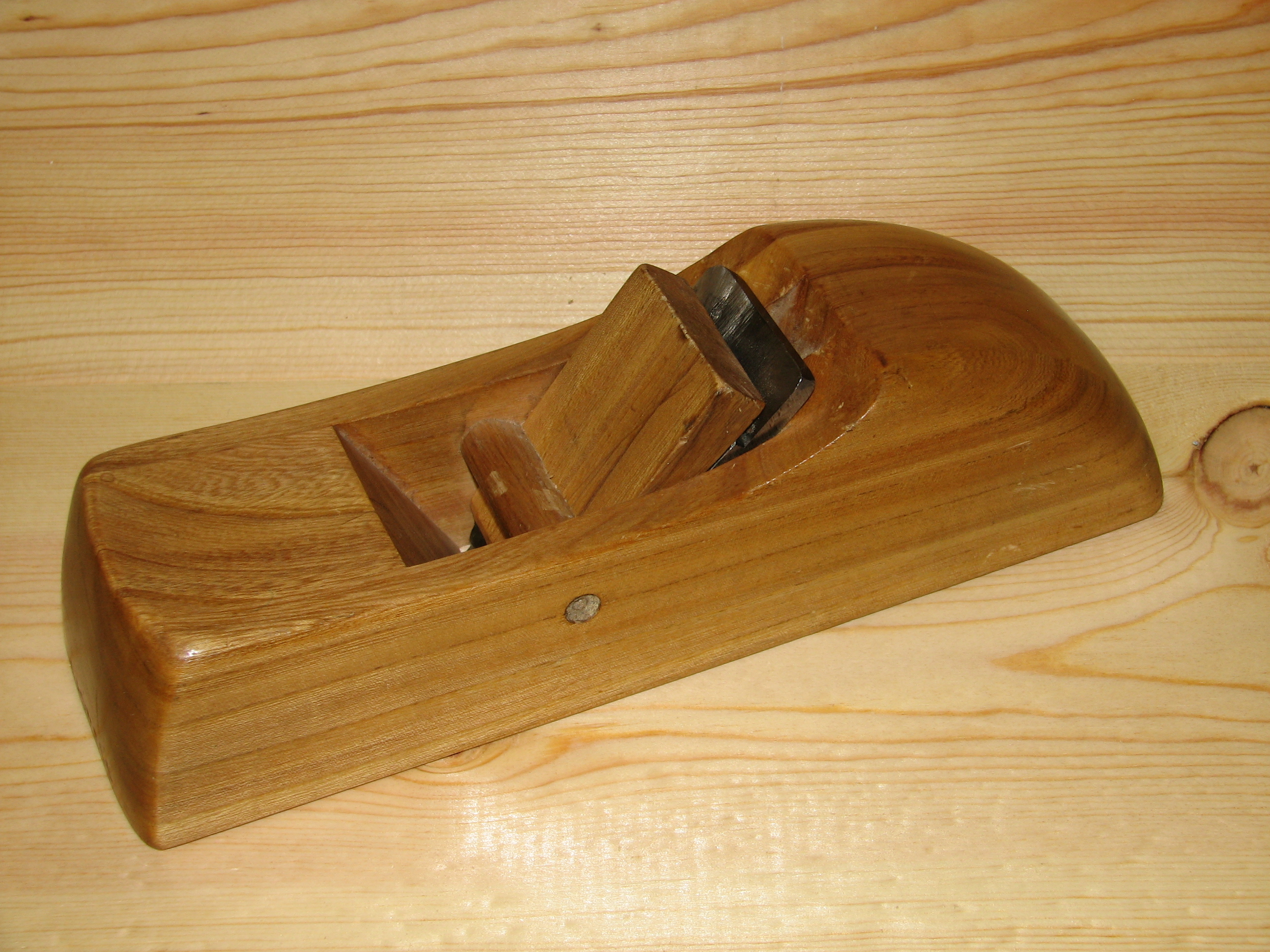
A Krenov-style wooden smoothing plane.

James Krenov (October 31, 1920 – September 9, 2009) was a woodworker and studio furnituremaker.

== Biography ==
James Dmitri Krenov was born on October 31, 1920, in the village of Uelen, Chukotka, the only child of Dimitri and Julia Krenov. He and his family left Russia the following year, and after some time in Shanghai, China, they moved to a remote village in Alaska, where his parents worked as teachers. They lived in Alaska for seven years. Jim remembered airplane drops of goods and supplies onto the snow for the villagers. In one of those bundles was a good steel jack-knife. "From the time I was 6, I was making my own toys with the jackknife," Jim told. "It was a joy to me that I could rely on my hands and my eyes to produce things." Eventually, the family moved to Seattle. Jim spent his teen years there, where he developed a love for the sea and began building model boats at first, graduating to sailboats before long. As a young man during World War II, Krenov served as a Russian interpreter for the military when Russian ships docked in Seattle. He also worked for a ship chandler and spent a great deal of time surrounded by boats. It influenced his aesthetic. He loved the lines of boats: "There's hardly a straight line on them, but there's harmony. People think right angles produce harmony, but they don't. They produce sleep," Krenov said.

In 1947 Jim and his mother moved to Europe. In Paris, in 1949, he met his future wife, Britta. They were married on March 2, 1951. Jim and Britta traveled together in Italy and France, and spent many summers in the mountains of Sweden where they liked to hike and he fished for trout in the mountain streams. Always a writer, Krenov published several articles and a novel chronicling these travels.

A friend in Sweden got Krenov a job building wooden architectural models for a restaurant designer; later Krenov got himself a spot at the Stockholm design school run by Carl Malmsten, considered the father of Scandinavian furniture design. He attended the famous Malmsten school for two years and then struck out on his own, keeping a shop in his basement. Toiling anonymously for years, he gradually built a reputation for his simple design. Once established as a master woodworker, Krenov also began sharing his expertise. "Krenov really helped re-create an interest in fine woodworking that had largely died out by the 1950s," says Frank Ramsay, president of the Bay Area Woodworkers Association, "Such a change from the 'make a box, cover it with plywood and paint it' era of the 1960s." Over time, Krenov received numerous requests to document his design philosophy in book format. In 1976, Krenov's first book, "A Cabinetmaker's Notebook" was published. The positive response to that first book surprised Krenov, and he ended up writing four more books including a final book that showcased the work of his students, "With Wakened Hands."

Krenov taught and lectured about his approach to woodworking at places such as the Rochester Institute of Technology in New York, Boston University, UC Santa Cruz, Graz, Austria, as a Fulbright guest at New Zealand's Craft Council, Takayama, Japan, and Anderson Ranch, Colorado. "I traveled all over the world to talk about my work," Krenov said. "These weren't high occasions - just people interested in talking with a craftsman. I'm known as the guy who is always interested in the thing that is both beautiful and useful."

In 1981, Krenov was invited to start the Fine Woodworking Program at the College of the Redwoods in Fort Bragg, California. Over the years, people from all over the world would come to the school. He retired from the College of the Redwoods in 2002 but continued to work in wood almost to the end of his life, from a shop at his home. His work is displayed in museums in Sweden, Norway, Japan, and the United States, as well as in the homes of some royal families. He became an Elected Fellow, American Craft Council in 2000, and was the first non-British recipient of the Annual Award of the Society of Designer-Craftsman's Centennial Medal in 1992. Krenov was presented with The Furniture Society's Award of Distinction in 2001.

In 2003, Fine Woodworking magazine asked Krenov how he would like to be remembered... He responded, "As a stubborn, old enthusiast."

In 2005 he cofounded Inside Passage School of Fine Cabinetmaking where he acted as an advisor until his death in 2009.

Krenov died in Fort Bragg, California on September 9, 2009. He was 88 years old.

== Influence ==
Krenov is revered by many craftsmen for his inspiration to bring into one's work simplicity, harmony and above all, a love of wood. As a professor at the College of the Redwoods, Krenov influenced many up-and-coming craftsmen including Yeung Chan, a now master craftsman. Krenov's books A Cabinetmaker's Notebook and The Impractical Cabinetmaker shun ostentatious and overly sculpted pieces, stains, sanded surfaces, and unbalanced or unproportional constructions. Krenov felt that details such as uniformly rounded edges, perfectly flat surfaces, and sharp corners remove the personal touch from a piece of furniture. His books extoll the virtues of clean lines, hand-planed surfaces, unfinished or lightly finished wood, and techniques that Krenov referred to as "honest".

== Approach ==
Although he made a living of his craft, Krenov referred to his attitude towards his work as that of an amateur, feeling that the competitive attitude of a professional causes one to compromise one's values as a craftsman. He avoided calling the conception and creation of a piece as "design," preferring a more inclusive term "composing." Composing, explained Krenov, is reacting to the wood, a continual re-evaluation and improvisation open to wherever the wood takes the composer.

In his cabinets and other pieces, Krenov paid careful attention to variations in woodgrain and color in his search for "harmony" in a piece. A self described "wood nut," he often sought out woods that are rare, highly figured, or containing unique coloration. Krenov was also highly critical of those who seek "originality" at the expense of well made furniture.

Although Krenov believed machinery has its place in the shop, (namely to efficiently complete the relatively grueling and crude early stages of stock removal and thicknessing) he felt an over-dependence on power tools removes the "fingerprints" left on the finished piece that only handwork can leave, and alienates the craftsman from his work. Krenov criticized the trend in woodworking schools toward the early use of power tools, instead of building a foundation of hand skills. Instead of focusing on which machinery one should buy, he put emphasis on having well-tuned equipment.

Graduates from Krenov's College of the Redwoods classes have gone on to professional furniture-making, writing craft books, and teaching in many programs throughout the world.

== Selected writings ==
- A Cabinetmaker's Notebook. Studio Vista. 1976. ISBN 0-289-70754-4.
- The Fine Art of Cabinetmaking. Studio Vista. 1977. ISBN 0-289-70797-8.
- The Impractical Cabinetmaker. Van Norstrand Reinhold. 1979. ISBN 0-442-24558-0.
- James Krenov: Worker in Wood. Van Norstrand Reinhold. 1981. ISBN 0-442-26336-8.
- Krenov; Janofsky (2000). With Wakened Hands. ISBN 1-892836-06-8.
- Krenov; Finck (2005). Making and Mastering Wood Planes. Sterling. ISBN 1-4027-2022-X.
