= Jack Rogers Hopkins =

American artist, mid-century modern sculptor

- Born: 28 December 1920; Modesto, Stanislaus County, California, US
- Died: 30 March 2006 (aged 85); San Diego, San Diego County, California, US
- Resting place: Fort Rosecrans National Cemetery
- Education: California College of Arts and Crafts
- Alma mater: Claremont Graduate School
- Notable work: “The Womb Room” circa 1971
- Style: Studio furniture
- Movement: Mid-century modern
- Spouse: Esther Hopkins
- Children: David Hopkins, Ann Begley-Hopkins, Mark Hopkins

Jack Rogers Hopkins (28 December 1920 – 30 March 2006) was an American designer–craftsman, known for his work in sculpture and woodworking. His work has been described as late mid-century modern. He is considered to be part of the early Californian branch of the studio furniture movement, and his work has been described as "environmental furniture".

== Biography ==
Born in Modesto, California, Jack Roger Hopkins spent time as a child in his father's woodshop, Sierra Furniture Mfg. Co., and according to design historian Daniella Ohad, he gained early notice in a local newspaper at the age of 12 for tin can sculptures. He later served in WW2 in the U.S. Navy, where he photographed war and reconnaissance for two years at Pearl Harbor station. He studied painting and drawing at the California College of Arts and Crafts through his Art Education degree until graduating in 1950, and continued on to get his MFA at the Claremont Colleges in 1958. He went on to work at San Diego State University in the Art Department until retirement in 1991, and was an active member of the local furniture design scene. The Allied Craftsmen of San Diego, a crafts organization in San Diego that was headed by Hopkins and Larry Hunter succeeding John Dirks (a professor at San Diego State University), was still active as of 2011. He died in March 2006. His life has been made into a documentary by Katie Nartonis and Jim Rawitsch of the Sam and Alfreda Maloof Foundation for Arts and Crafts, which has been screened at the Claremont Lewis Museum of Art.

== Work ==
Hopkins's work largely focused on the use of more natural and free-form shapes in furniture, such as his inclusion of naturalistic swirls. He regularly carried a sketchbook for his ideas, and was inspired by natural forms like driftwood. He also worked in the mediums of ceramics, painting, photography, and jewelry. Hopkins used natural materials in his work (such as hardwoods like cherry, mahogany, and rosewood) and used stacked lamination methods; he would laminate wooden strips and then shape them to form his sculptures. Popular Science in 1948 described his work as “layercake of lumber and glue”. Laminating wood allowed for flexibility artistically as he could then incorporate differently colored wood, and required technical skill as the wood grains must be placed at specific angles so as to avoid differing expansion and contraction points, which would cause the work to fall apart in varying temperature and humidity. This consideration is characteristic of his concern for aesthetic in conjunction with utility. His work is an example of San Diego Modernism, and quantities of it were destroyed due to a 2018 fire. Images of his work were published in the October 1974 publication of the AIA Journal and in the Teachers Research Packet published by the Museum of Arts and Design (MAD). His work is in collections at the San Francisco Museum of Modern Art and the Los Angeles County Museum of Art, and has also been exhibited at the Oceanside Museum of Art and the Museum of Fine Arts, Boston. His work was shown at the California Design Exhibitions, especially wooden furniture.

== Work listed ==
- “The Womb Room” circa 1971, sculpture, destroyed.
