= Thomas Hucker =

American furniture designer (born 1955)

Thomas Hucker (born 1955) is an American artist working in furniture.

== Early years ==
Hucker was born in Bryn Mawr, Pennsylvania. He apprenticed for two years under German-American cabinet maker Leonard Hilgner (1931–2015). He attended four summer study sessions at the Penland School of Crafts studying under the likes of Sam Maloof. From 1976 until 1980 he earned a Certificate of Mastery from Boston University Program in Artisanry followed by time at Tokyo University and a degree from Domus Academy in Milan, Italy.

== Style ==
Hucker has from early on incorporated Japanese aesthetics and has cited an early meeting with Isamu Noguchi in the late Seventies as heavily influential. His influences also include classical music, jazz musicians including Leonard Hilgner.

== Exhibitions ==
- Cooper Hewitt Museum
- Museum of Fine Arts, Boston

== Awards and recognition ==
- American Craft Council College of Fellows
- Fellowship from the National Endowment for the Arts (1983)
- Fulbright Scholarship for Tokyo University (2018)

== In popular culture ==
- In the Parks and Recreation episode "Moving Up," Hucker is referenced by Ron Swanson, whose character is also a wood-working artisan.
