= Baulines Craft Guild =

American non-profit organization

Baulines Craft Guild is a non-profit organization dedicated to promoting California's craft arts legacy. It was established in 1972 by Tom D'Onofrio. The organization produces a newsletter, organizes exhibitions, education programs, and marketing assistance. Art Espenet Carpenter was a founding member. Ida Grae, author of Nature's Colors, was another original member.
