= Hank Gilpin =

American sculptor

- Born: 1946 (age 79–80)
- Education: Rhode Island School of Design
- Occupation: Woodworker
- Years active: 1973 – Present
- Notable work: Wardrobe, Bench, Desk and bookcase

Hank Gilpin is an American furniture maker and wood sculptor. He is known for using distinctive types of wood. His work is in the collection of the Museum of Fine Arts, Boston. Having worked under Tage Frid while studying at the Rhode Island School of Design, Gilpin owns and operates a woodworking shop in Lincoln, Rhode Island.
