= The Furniture Society =

American non-profit arts organization

The Furniture Society, founded in 1996, is a membership-based 501(c)(3) nonprofit corporation working to advance the art of furniture-making by promoting excellence in that field. The Society, based in Asheville, North Carolina, has an international membership comprising furniture makers as well as other professionals and members of the public.

== Background ==
The Society provides a range of programs including annual conferences, exhibitions, publications, scholarships and awards of excellence.

== Annual Conferences ==
The Society convenes an annual conference, in locations across the United States and Canada, usually in June. Each conference offers keynotes, artists’ presentations, practical demonstrations, theoretical discussions, and business improvement seminars. Past venues have included:

- Purchase, New York (1997)
- San Francisco, California (1998)
- Smithville, Tennessee (1999)
- Toronto, Ontario (2000)
- Tempe, Arizona (2001)
- Madison, Wisconsin (2002)
- Philadelphia, Pennsylvania (2003)
- Savannah, Georgia (2004)
- San Diego, California (2005)
- Indianapolis, Indiana (2006)
- Victoria, British Columbia (2007)
- SUNY Purchase (2008)
- Boone, North Carolina (2009)
- Cambridge, Massachusetts (2010)
- Portland, Maine (2012)
- Los Angeles, California (2013)
- Port Townsend, Washington (2014)
- Durham, North Carolina (2015)
- Philadelphia, Pennsylvania (2016)
- Kansas City, Missouri (joint conference with the American Association of Woodturners)(2017)
- San Francisco, California (2018)
- Milwaukee, Wisconsin (2019).

== Exhibitions ==
The Furniture Society has sponsored several major exhibitions of studio furniture. These include:

- Multiplicity: The art of the Furniture Prototype (2008)
- Show Us Your Drawers (2006)
- Curv-iture (2004)
- The Maker's Hand (2004, co-sponsored with The Museum of *Fine Art, Boston)
- Cabinets of Curiosities (2003, co-sponsored with The Wood *Turning Center)
- WilsonArt Invitational (2003, co-sponsored with WilsonArt)
- The Right Stuff (2002)
- The Circle Unbroken (1999)
- Contemporary North American Furniture (1997—invitational)

== The Award of Distinction ==
The Award of Distinction is conferred annually by The Furniture Society upon one or more living individuals who are recognized as having had a profound impact on the field of studio furniture. The honorees exemplify lives devoted to study, work, and craft, as well as the education of others in the field.

The award is presented each year as a major event during the annual conference. Past recipients of the award include:

Year	Name	Notes	Ref.
2001	Arthur Espenet Carpenter; Wendell Castle; Tage Frid; James Krenov; Sam Maloof		
2002	John Makepeace; Jere Osgood; Alan Peters		
2003	Jonathan Leo Fairbanks; William Keyser		
2004	Garry Knox Bennett		
2005	Judy Kensley McKie		
2006	Tommy Simpson		
2007	Michael Fortune		
2008	Wendy Maruyama; Walker Weed		
2009	Vladimir Kagan		
2010	John Cederquist		
2012	Rosanne Somerson		
2014	Bebe Johnson; Warren Johnson	awarded jointly as Pritam & Eames	
2015	Thomas Hucker		
2016	Edward S. Cooke		
2018	Craig Nutt		
2019	Tom Loeser		
2020	Kristina Madsen		

=== History ===
The Awards were first presented in 2001, at the annual Furniture Society conference held that year in Tempe, Arizona. Five craftsmen were honored simultaneously in the first presentation, in order to make up for time lost in planning and funding the awards and to ensure that these five iconic figures in furniture making and education were properly recognized in their lifetimes. One of the initial honorees, Tage Frid, was unable to attend the ceremony due to health issues and died several months later. Three of the other initial honorees—Art Carpenter, Sam Maloof and James Krenov are now deceased.

Although the Award of Distinction has most often been presented to furniture makers and educators, anyone who has made significant contributions to the field of studio furniture can be considered. In 2003, for example, one of the honorees was furniture historian and curator Jonathan Fairbanks

== Publications ==
Five biennial journals on Studio Furniture have been published by the Furniture Society: Furniture Studio: The Heart of the Functional Arts, 1999 Furniture Studio: Tradition in Contemporary Furniture, 2001 Furniture Studio: Furniture Makers Exploring Digital Technologies, 2005 Furniture Studio: Focus on Materials, 2006 and Furniture Studio: The Meaning of Craft, 2007 These volumes offer essays on design, fabrication and history as well as a pictorial gallery of the finest work made from the 1990s on. The Society also publishes catalogs to accompany the major exhibitions of furniture that it has initiated or co-sponsored with leading institutions, and a quarterly print newsletter, Furniture Matters. Recent Furniture Society publications also include The Maker's Hand: American Studio Furniture, 1940-1990 (168 pages, illustrated), 2003 from the Museum of Fine Arts Publications, Mind & Hand: Contemporary Studio Furniture (160 pages, illustrated), 2012 and Rooted: Creating a Sense of Place: Contemporary Studio Furniture (160 pages, illustrated), 2015, both from Schiffer Publishing.

== See also ==
- Chippendale Society
- Furniture History Society
