= Arthur Carpenter (furniture maker) =

American woodworker (1920–2006)

Arthur Espenet Carpenter (January 20, 1920 – May 25, 2006) was a master woodworker and furniture maker in Bolinas, California known for his wishbone chair and desk with scalloped seashell sides. Self-taught, he joined the Baulines Craft Guild. He also taught had apprentices. His work is in the collection of the Smithsonian Institution and has been exhibited in The Museum of Modern Art and The Museum of Arts and Design in New York. He was declared a "living California treasure" in 1984. He received The Furniture Society's Award of Distinction in 2001.
