= Judy Kensley McKie =

American furniture maker

- Born: 1944 (age 81–82); Boston, Massachusetts, U.S.
- Other name: Judy McKie
- Education: Rhode Island School of Design
- Occupations: Furniture designer, furniture maker
- Known for: Furniture craft
- Movement: Studio furniture

Judy Kensley McKie (born 1944) is an American artist, furniture designer, and furniture maker. She has been making her signature style of furniture with carved and embellished animal and plant motifs since 1977. She is based in Boston, Massachusetts.

== Early life and education ==
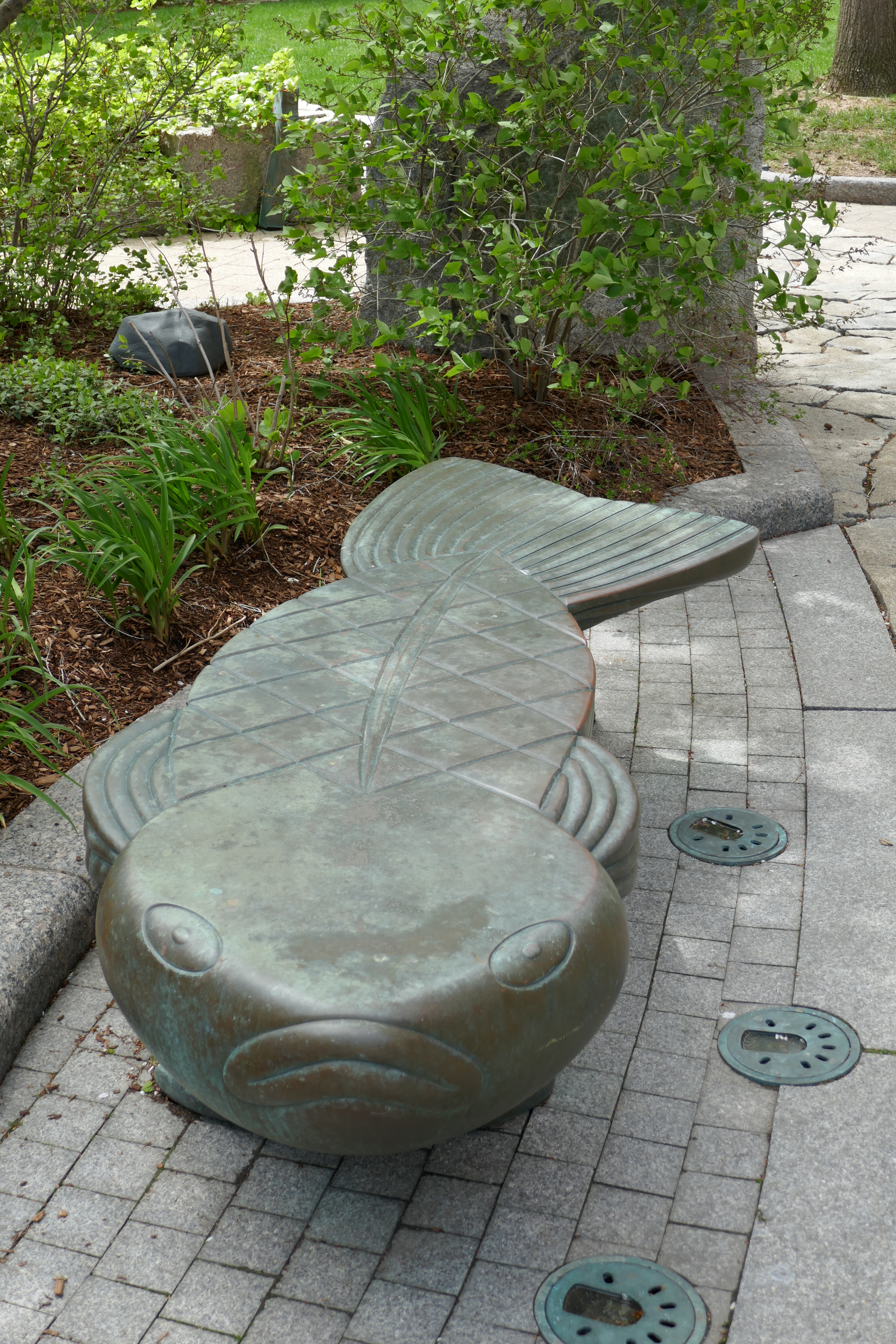
Judy Kensley McKie bench at Eastport Park, Boston

Judy Kensley McKie was born in 1944 in Boston, Massachusetts. As a young person, McKie worked with her graphic designer father in his woodshop, helping to manufacturing pieces. She cites this work as early inspiration to make furniture.

She received her BFA degree in painting from the Rhode Island School of Design in 1966. As a painter, she was drawn to figurative art from ancient cultures, an influence that shows up later in her furniture. Her entrance to furniture making came from the necessity to furnish her own home and to create pieces of furniture for her friends.

== Career ==
In the late 60s, she joined a cooperative workspace called "New Hamburger Cabinet Works". While working in this space, McKie honed her craft skills through trial-and-error and by working around other furniture makers such as Michael Hurwitz. After several years of working on cabinetry and other projects built collaboratively with the other members of the cooperative, McKie ventured into her own style which included curves, personal ideals, and inspiration from plants and animals.

McKie began to carve low-relief patterns of animals and nature into her furniture work in 1975. This started on flat surfaces such as boxes and evolved to the structural elements of the work such as a table in which two dogs with long tails and bones in their mouths sit underneath a glass table top and a rocking chair with a pair of rattle snakes as the rockers. This unique style of work earned Mckie sales and commissions as well as significant recognition in the field of studio furniture.

McKie's work was included alongside her contemporaries Wendell Castle and Joyce Anderson in the 1979 exhibition "New Handmade Furniture: American Furniture Makers Working in Hardwood" held at the American Craft Museum in New York City. in 2004, McKie held a solo exhibition at Pritam & Eames gallery. In the Spring of 2018, McKie had a solo exhibition at the Museum of Craft and Design in San Francisco "Judy Kensley McKie: Cast of Characters", curated by Glenn Adamson and Ariel Zaccheo.

Her work is included in the collection of the Smithsonian American Art Museum (SAAM). Her piece, Leopard Chest, was acquired by SAAM as part of the Renwick Gallery's 50th Anniversary Campaign.

== Awards and honors ==
- 1998 - Fellow, The American Craft Council
- 2005 - Award of Distinction, the Furniture Society
