= Tage Frid =

American artist, woodworker

- Born: 30 May 1915; Denmark
- Died: 4 May 2004 (aged 88); Newport, Rhode Island, U.S.
- Occupations: Professor, woodworker, furniture designer, author
- Known for: Modern Design

Tage Frid (30 May 1915 – 4 May 2004) was a Danish-born woodworker, educator and author who influenced the development of the studio furniture movement in the United States. His design work was often in the Danish-modern style, best known for his three legged stool and his publications.

== Early life ==
Son of a silversmith, at the age of 13, he started a five-year apprenticeship in Copenhagen followed by work in cabinet shops; worked for nearly a decade at the Royal Danish Cabinetmakers, then spent time in Iceland before immigrating to the United States in 1948 at the request of the American Craft Council.

== Later career ==
Frid headed the program in woodworking of the School for American Craftsmen (SAC) in Alfred, New York; later moving with this program to Rochester Institute of Technology. In 1962 he became professor of Woodworking and Furniture Design at the Rhode Island School of Design (RISD), remaining until 1985.

When teaching, he emphasized a craftsman's need to learn all the available tools and methods one could use to complete a given task. Thus, the person can work in any shop situation and produce the same quality. Frid's students include noted American studio furniture makers such as Hank Gilpin, Jere Osgood, Alphonse Mattia, William Keyser, John Dunnigan, and Rosanne Somerson.

He was an editor of Fine Woodworking magazine from its inception in 1975 to his death.

In 2001, Tage Frid was honored by The Furniture Society with its Award of Distinction. The Permanent collection of the Museum of Fine Arts, Boston owns some of his designs, most of which represent the Danish modern style.

== Publications ==
Frid is best known for his three-volume work, "Tage Frid Teaches Woodworking". Some editions of which are published as the first two volumes in one, the third is still separate (Frid's own classic European-style workbench is detailed, in a revised and corrected version, in the third edition of this essential series):

- Frid, Tage (2005). Tage Frid Teaches Woodworking: Three Step-by-Step Guidebooks to Essential Woodworking Techniques. Taunton Press. pp. 688 pp. + DVD. ISBN 978-1-56158-826-8.
- Frid, Tage (1993). Book 1: Joinery & Book 2: Shaping, Veneering, Finishing. Tage Frid Teaches Woodworking. Taunton Press. pp. 206 pp. + 210 pp. ISBN 1-56158-068-6.
- Frid, Tage (1985). Book 3: Furnituremaking. Tage Frid Teaches Woodworking. Taunton Press. p. 231 pp. ISBN 0-918804-40-X.
