= Alphonse Mattia =

American furniture designer (1947–2023)

- Born: 1947; Philadelphia, Pennsylvania, U.S.
- Died: April 10, 2023 (aged 75–76)
- Education: Philadelphia College of Art, Rhode Island School of Design
- Occupations: woodworker, furniture designer, professor
- Movement: Avant Garde Furniture, American Studio Furniture
- Website: alphonsemattia.com

Alphonse Mattia (1947 – April 10, 2023) was an American furniture designer, woodworker, sculptor and educator. In 2005, Alphonse Mattia was elected a Fellow of the American Craft Council (ACC).

== Biography ==
Alphonse Mattia was born in 1947 in Philadelphia, Pennsylvania. He was raised in an Italian American, Catholic family. He attended Philadelphia College of Art (now known as the University of the Arts) and graduated with a BFA degree. Mattia has a MFA degree in 1973 in industrial design from Rhode Island School of Design, where he also studied furniture under Tage Frid.

Mattia taught at Virginia Commonwealth University (from 1973 to 1976); Boston University (from 1976 to 1985); the Swain School of Design (from 1985 to 1988); and at Rhode Island School of Design (starting in 1990). Mattia was instrumental in the establishment of the Boston University Program in Artisanry in 1975, which was later purchased by the Swain School of Design in 1985. The Program in Artisanry had emphasized art over craft. Mattia's notable students included Emi Ozawa.

Mattia's work can be found in museum collections including at the Smithsonian American Art Museum, Museum of Arts and Design, Museum of Fine Arts, Boston, Philadelphia Museum of Art, Rhode Island School of Design Museum, and at the Fine Arts Museums of San Francisco.
