= Jere Osgood =

American furniture designer

Jere Osgood (7 February 1936 –10 October 2023) was an American studio furniture maker, and teacher of furniture and woodworking. He taught for many years in the Boston University Program in Artisanry.

== Early life and education ==
Jere Osgood was born in 1936 and raised in Staten Island, New York. He studied architecture at the University of Illinois but left after two years to pursue furniture design and fabrication. Thereafter, he enrolled at the School of American Craftsmen at Rochester Institute of Technology and learned furniture making under Tage Frid. Osgood was also influenced by the work of Wharton Esherick. He completed the four-year program in about two years, receiving his B.F.A. in 1960. He supported himself while in school by fabricating and selling small wood objects of his own design. Osgood was interested in the modern furniture being made in Scandinavia and studied in Denmark in 1960-1961.

== Career ==
On his return to the United States, Osgood established a studio in New Milford, Connecticut, where he made small objects. In the late 1960s he began to make large projects and explored different techniques of laminating wood. He published his explorations of lamination between 1977 and 1979 in Fine Woodworking magazine.

Osgood taught briefly at Philadelphia College of Art, then at Rochester Institute of Technology for three years. In 1975, he moved to Boston University where he worked with Dan Jackson and Alphonse Mattia to build the "Program in Artisanry".

At the time of his death, Osgood resided in Wilton, New Hampshire, where he continued to design and build furniture in his own studio. He was a member of The Furniture Society (and a recipient of that organization's Award of Distinction) and New Hampshire Furniture Masters Association.

Osgood died on October 10, 2023, at the age of 87.
