= Studio furniture =

American art movement

Studio furniture is an American sub-field of studio craft centered on one-of-a-kind or limited production furniture objects designed and built by craftspeople. The work is made in a craftsperson's studio setting as opposed to being made in a high volume factory. This conception of the site of production as being a studio links studio furniture to studio art and reflects its status as an individual creative process. From the earliest furniture of the Arts and Crafts movement to modern-day works of art, studio furniture can be generalized as handmade functional objects that serve as a medium for intellectual and emotional expression and indicate social and cultural concerns of the maker or community. The Furniture Society is an organization devoted to the history and legacy of studio furniture.

== Elements ==
=== Concept ===
Studio furniture objects often embody creative and/or communicative intent, a unique design, elements of functionality (either implicit or explicit), craftsmanship, and an intimate understanding of material in their creation. Studio furniture objects, perhaps because of their close association with sculpture and other fine art, are shown as often in art galleries as they are in furniture showrooms. As is the case in the studio crafts at large, this contested identity is the impetus for frequent intra-field dialogue and differing intellectual positions on the matter

=== Design ===
Studio furniture incorporates the design process differently than industrial design or product design, but the designing of the object is an integral and important part of its creation none-the-less. Because of the requisite functionality (or implied functionality) of studio furniture, makers must design objects so that they fulfill their intended physical purpose. For example, a functional chair must be able to support the weight of the human body in a sitting position. After this requirement is met, other purposes may also be supported; the chair might also be designed with certain ergonomic considerations for user comfort or it might additionally be able to support the body while standing or reclining. While the meeting of physical requirements links studio furniture to other design fields, the expression of personal creative intent links the practice to the fine arts. Design comes into play in the realization of this intent as well; successful studio furniture must be designed to simultaneously meet conceptual needs without compromising its functional goals.

The practice of design within the field of studio furniture, as with other studio crafts, follows a trajectory that is unique in terms of the process of making. The design process begins with preliminary sketches or models, but this is not a “preconceptualization of the finished work in all its elements and details” which would then be executed by a maker (separate from the designer), as it might be in a product design setting. According to Howard Risatti in A Theory of Craft, "instead of being separated into stages, conception and execution are integrated so that a subtle feedback system occurs when physical properties of materials encounter conceptual form and conceptual form encounters physical material". The design of the object, to a great degree, happens concurrently with its creation. The skill of the maker and his or her ability to work with the subtleties and variations of the material, allowing those variations to inform and exalt the conceptual and functional goals of the piece, is intrinsically tied into the object’s design.

== Noted studio furniture makers ==
- Jack Rogers Hopkins
- Jere Osgood
- Judy Kensley McKie
- Tage Frid
- Wharton Esherick
