= List of furniture designers =

This is a list of notable people whose primary occupation is furniture design.

== A ==
- Alvar Aalto (1898–1976)
- Eero Aarnio (born 1932)
- Robert Adam (1728–1792)
- Thomas Affleck (1745–1795)
- Franco Albini (1905–1977)
- Davis Allen (1916–1999)
- Gordon Andrews (1914–2001)
- Ron Arad (born 1951)
- Ini Archibong (born 1983)
- David Armstrong-Jones, 2nd Earl of Snowdon (born 1961)
- Gae Aulenti (1927–2012)
- Jean Avisse (1723–1796)

== B ==
- Bae Se-hwa (born 1980)
- Fred Baier (born 1949)
- Edward Barber and Jay Osgerby (born 1969)
- Milo Baughman (1923–2003)
- Mario Bellini (born 1935)
- Harry Bertoia (1915–1978)
- Lina Bo Bardi (1914–1992)
- Cini Boeri (1924–2020)
- André Charles Boulle (1642–1732)
- Ronan and Erwan Bouroullec (born 1971 and 1976)
- Marcel Breuer (1902–1981)
- Simone Brewster (born c. 1983)
- Jeremy Broun
- Stephen Burks (born 1969)
- Busk + Hertzog

== C ==
- Poul Cadovius (1911—2011)
- Louise Campbell (born 1970)
- David Caon (born 1977)
- Achille Castiglioni (1918–2002)
- Livio Castiglioni (1911–1971)
- Pier Giacomo Castiglioni (1913–1968)
- Wendell Castle (1932–2018)
- Don Chadwick (born 1936)
- William Chambers (1723–1796)
- Eliphalet Chapin (1741–1807)
- Thomas Chippendale (1718–1779)
- Thomas Chippendale, the younger (1749–1822)
- Antonio Citterio (born 1950)
- John Cobb (1715–1778)
- Kenneth Cobonpue (born 1968)
- Muriel Coleman (1917–2003)
- Mac Collins (born 1995)
- Joe Colombo (1930–1971)
- Terence Conran (1931–2020)
- Henry Copland (1728–1754)
- Charles Cressent (1685–1768)

== D ==
- Mario Dal Fabbro (1913–1990)
- Giuseppe Gaetano Descalzi (1767–1855)
- Niels Diffrient (1928–2013)
- Nanna Ditzel (1923–2005)
- Tom Dixon (born 1959)
- A. M. Dinesen (1930–2017)

== E ==
- Ray (1912–1988) and Charles Eames (1907–1978)
- Charles Eastlake (1836–1906)
- Thomas Elfe (1719–1775)
- Olav Eldøy (born 1948)
- Paul Evans (1931–1987)

== F ==
- Grant Featherston (1922–1995)
- Pierre François Léonard Fontaine (1762–1853)
- Paul T. Frankl (1887–1958)
- Naoto Fukasawa (born 1956)
- Frans Schrofer (born 1956)

== G ==
- Peter Ghyczy (1940–2022)
- Grinling Gibbons (1648–1721)
- Ernest Gimson (1864–1919)
- Eileen Gray (1878–1976)
- Molly Gregory (1914–2006)
- Hector Guimard (1867–1942)

== H ==
- Christopher Guy Harrison (1960–2020)
- Ambrose Heal (1872–1959)
- George Hepplewhite (c. 1727–1786)
- René Herbst (1891–1982)
- James Hilton (born 1973)
- Matthew Hilton (born 1957)
- Jacques Hitier (1917–1999)
- Josef Hoffman (1870–1956)
- Thomas Hope (1769–1831)
- Luke Hughes (born 1957)
- Richard Hutten (born 1967)

== I ==
- Yinka Ilori (born 1987)
- James Irvine (1958–2013)

== J ==
- Arne Jacobsen (1902–1971)
- Dakota Jackson (born 1949)
- Charles Hollis Jones (born 1945)
- Hella Jongerius (born 1963)
- Finn Juhl (1912–1989)

== K ==
- Vladimir Kagan (1927–2016)
- Frederik Kayser (1924–1968)
- William Kent (1685–1748)
- Poul Kjærholm (1929–1980)
- Florence Knoll (1917–2019)
- Silas Kopf (born 1949)
- Susan Kozma-Orlay (1913–2008)
- James Krenov (1920–2009)
- Shiro Kuramata (1934–1991)

== L ==
- Max Lamb (born 1980)
- Charles-Honoré Lannuier (1779–1819)
- Paul László (1900–1993)
- Charles Limbert (1854–1923)
- François Linke (1855–1946)
- David Linley (born 1961)
- Piero Lissoni (born 1956)
- Mathias Lock (18th century)
- Samuel Loomis (1748–1814)
- Ross Lovegrove (born 1958)
- Wendell Lovett (1922–2016)
- Fred Lowen (1919–2005)

== M ==
- Sal Maccarone (born 1949)
- Charles Rennie Mackintosh (1868–1928)
- Vico Magistretti (1920–2006)
- Terence Main (born 1954)
- John Makepeace (born 1939)
- Sam Maloof (1916–2009)
- Cecilie Manz (born 1972)
- Sabine Marcelis (born 1985)
- Enzo Mari (1932–2020)
- Daniel Marot (1661–1752)
- Wendy Maruyama (born 1952)
- Bruno Mathson (1907–1988)
- Judy Kensley McKie (born 1944)
- Alberto Meda (born 1945)
- Christien Meindertsma (born 1980)
- Alessandro Mendini (1931–2019)
- Børge Mogensen (1914–1972)
- Thomas C. Molesworth (1890–1977)
- Carlo Mollino (1905–1973)
- Jasper Morrison (born 1959)
- Olivier Mourgue (born 1939)

== N ==
- George Nakashima (1905–1990)
- George Nelson (1908–1986)
- Marc Newson (born 1963)
- Marcus Nonnenmacher (1653–1720)
- Nolen Niu (born 1975)
- Isamu Noguchi (1904–1988)
- Arne Norell (1917–1971)
- Wallace Nutting (1861–1941)

== O ==
- Jean Francis Oeben (1721–1763)
- Jay Sae Jung Oh (born 1982)
- Jonathan Olivares (born 1981)
- Sergio Orozco (born 20th century)

== P ==
- Augustus Charles Pugin (1762–1832)
- Augustus Pugin (1812–1852)
- Verner Panton (1926–1998)
- Satyendra Pakhale (1967)
- Xavier Pauchard (1880–1948)
- Kenneth Peacock (1922–2000)
- Charlotte Perriand (1903–1999)
- Charles Percier (1764–1838)
- Alan Peters (1933–2009)
- Duncan Phyfe (1768–1854)
- Giancarlo Piretti (born 1940)
- Warren Platner (1919–2006)
- Ferdinand Plitzner (1678–1724)
- Charles Pollock (1930–2013)
- Jean Prouvé (1901–1984)
- Andrée Putman (1925–2013)

== R ==
- Ernest Race (1913–1964)
- Dieter Rams (born 1932)
- Karim Rashid (born 1960)
- Lilly Reich (1885–1947)
- Jean Henri Riesener (1734–1806)
- Gerrit Rietveld (1888–1964)
- Jens Risom (1916–2016)
- Willy Rizzo (1928–2013)
- T. H. Robsjohn-Gibbings (1905–1976)
- David Roentgen (1743–1807)
- Samuel Ross (born 1991)
- André Jacob Roubo (1739–1791)
- Alexander Roux (1813–1886)
- David Rowland (1924–2010)
- Gordon Russell (1892–1980)

== S ==
- Eero Saarinen (1910–1961)
- Kasper Salto (born 1967)
- Richard Sapper (1932–2015)
- Sergio Savarese (1958–2006)
- Timothy Schreiber (born 20th century)
- Frans Schrofer (born 1956)
- George Seddon (1727–1801)
- Maarten van Severen (1956–2005)
- Thomas Shearer (18th century)
- Thomas Sheraton (1751–1806)
- Alma Siedhoff-Buscher (1899–1944)
- Bořek Šípek (1949–2016)
- Janice Smith (born 20th century)
- Rosanne Somerson (born 1954)
- Ettore Sottsass (1917–2007)
- Russell Spanner (1916–1974)
- Bodo Sperlein
- Mart Stam (1899–1986)
- Philippe Starck (born 1949)
- Gustav Stickley (1858–1942)
- Bill Stumpf (1936–2006)
- Sympson (fl. 1660s)

== T ==
- Norman Teague (born 1968)
- Michael Thonet (1796–1871)
- Matteo Thun (born 1952)
- Frederick William Tod (1879–1958)
- Johannes Torpe (born 1973)
- David Trubridge (born 1951)

== U ==
- Patricia Urquiola (born 1961)

== V ==
- Henry van de Velde (1863–1957)
- William Vile (c. 1700–1767)
- Lella Vignelli (1934–2016)
- Massimo Vignelli (1931–2014)
- Arne Vodder (1926–2009)

== W ==
- Katie Walker (born 1969)
- Marcel Wanders (born 1963)
- Hans J. Wegner (1914–2007)
- Alexander Westerlund (born 1985)
- Bethan Laura Wood (born 1983)
- Russel Wright (1904–1976)

== Y ==
- Tokujin Yoshioka (born 1967)
- Michael Young (born 1966)

== Z ==
- Giorgia Zanellato (fl 2000s), Italian designer
- Nika Zupanc (born 1974)
