= Norell =

Norell is a surname. Notable people with the surname include:

- Arne Norell (1917–1971), Swedish furniture designer
- Ingeborg Norell (born 1727), the first Finnish female to have received an official decoration
- Mark Norell (1957–2025), American paleontologist and molecular geneticist
- Michael Norell (born 1937), American screenwriter/actor and Executive Producer
- Norman Norell (1900–1972), American fashion designer
- Ola Norell or Ola Rapace (born 1971), Swedish actor

== See also ==
- Norell (fragrance)
- Norell Oson Bard, a Swedish songwriting and production trio made up of Tim Norell, Ola Håkansson and Alexander Bard
- Nordell
- Norvell (disambiguation)
- Norvelle
- Norwell (disambiguation)
