= Nienkämper =

Company

- Type: Private
- Industry: Manufacturing
- Founded: 1968
- Founder: Klaus Nienkämper
- Headquarters: Toronto, Ontario, Canada
- Area served: Worldwide
- Products: Furniture
- Website: https://www.nienkamper.com/

Nienkämper is a furniture manufacturer founded by Klaus Nienkämper in 1968. The North American company operates a 120,000-square-foot factory in Toronto's east end that produces furniture for office, residential, institutional and hospitality applications with showrooms in Toronto, New York, Chicago and Dallas.

== History ==
Klaus Nienkämper, who emigrated to Canada from Duisburg, Germany in 1960, is recognized for helping to introduce modern European furniture to Canadians at a time when modernism was just beginning to enter the country. In Making Toronto Modern, Christopher Armstrong argues that Toronto’s residents only started to adopt modernism in the 1950s, and that Finnish architect Viljo Revell’s Toronto City Hall, which opened in 1965, was a turning point for the city's Modernism movement. "Nienkamper threw himself into one of Canada's most optimistic eras," writes architecture critic Lisa Rochon, "when government-sponsored design centres in Montreal, Ottawa and Toronto opened and exhibitions travelled across the country." He supplied furniture to Moshe Safdie’s Habitat housing complex at Expo 67 in Montreal, the minimalist terminal of Gander International Airport, and the lounge at Toronto’s Pearson International Airport. In this milieu, Nienkämper established his eponymous furniture company in 1968, opening a showroom at 300 King Street East in Toronto in the same year. While the company began as an importer and manufacturer under license for such modern European brands as Knoll and de Sede. Nienkämper eventually developed its own furniture collections designed by international and Canadian designers.

In 2019, Klaus Nienkämper was the recipient of the Allied Arts Metal from the Royal Architectural Institute of Canada (RAIC) for his role in advancing furniture design in Canada. As one juror put it, "Klaus Nienkämper’s furniture designs are fundamental to late-century Canadian architectural history."

== 296 King Street East ==
In Exploring Toronto, a guidebook published by the Toronto Chapter of Architects in 1972, Canadian architect Ron Thom points out "Klaus Nienkämper’s store" at 300 King Street East. Only a few years earlier, in 1968, Nienkämper had renovated the derelict building at the corner of King and Jarvis streets into a modern furniture showroom, which was the first of its kind in Canada. In the 70s, when Toronto bars closed at 11 p.m., Nienkämper ran a well-attended speakeasy in the store. Today, it is surrounded by residential design stores that are known collectively as the King East Design District. The showroom is presently operated by Nienkämper’s son, Klaus Nienkämper II, who rebranded it as Klaus by Nienkämper in 2001 and expanded the showroom's offering to include both Nienkämper and international brand designs.

== Work ==
Over five decades, Nienkämper has collaborated with a roster of designers and architects including Thomas Lamb, Tom Deacon, Yabu Pushelberg, Mark Müller, Scot Laughton, Karim Rashid, Shim Sutcliffe, Busk + Hertzog, Hadi Teherani, Andre Staffelbach, and many others on furniture collections.

With architect Arthur Erickson, Nienkämper produced furniture for Canadian Prime Minister Pierre Trudeau’s office in Ottawa (1976); the Embassy of Canada in Washington D.C. (1989), and Roy Thomson Hall in Toronto (1982). Working with architect Daniel Libeskind, Nienkämper produced the stainless steel Spirit House Chair for the Crystal addition to Toronto's Royal Ontario Museum, completed by Libeskind in 2007. The 50 lb., laser-cut chair was the architect's first foray into furniture design, and is linked aesthetically and spiritually to the museum's architecture.

== Selected Furniture Awards ==
Vox Conference Tables by Mark Müller, 1997

- National Post Toronto Bronze Award, 2003
- Best of Canada Award, 2002
- Design Journal ADEX Award, 2001
- NeoCon Best of Show, 2001
- National Post Design Exchange Gold Award, 2000

Kloud Collection by Karim Rashid, 2006

- The Chicago Athenaeum Good Design Award, 2007
- Design Journal ADEX Award, 2007

Metronome by Fig40, 2011

- Red Dot Design Award, 2013
- IIDEX/NeoCon Silver Award, 2011

Heartbeat by Karim Rashid, 2019

- The Chicago Athenaeum Good Design Award, 2019
- Interior Design HiP Award, 2019
- Best of NeoCon Editor's Choice Award, 2019
