= Norrell =

Norrell is a surname. Notable people with the surname include:

- Catherine Dorris Norrell (1901–1981), American politician
- Clif Norrell, record producer
- Mandy Powers Norrell (born 1973), American politician
- William F. Norrell (1896–1961), American politician

== See also ==
- Jonathan Strange & Mr Norrell
- Norell
