= Burroughes Building =

Building in Toronto, Ontario, Canada

Coordinates: 43.64704°N 79.403676°W

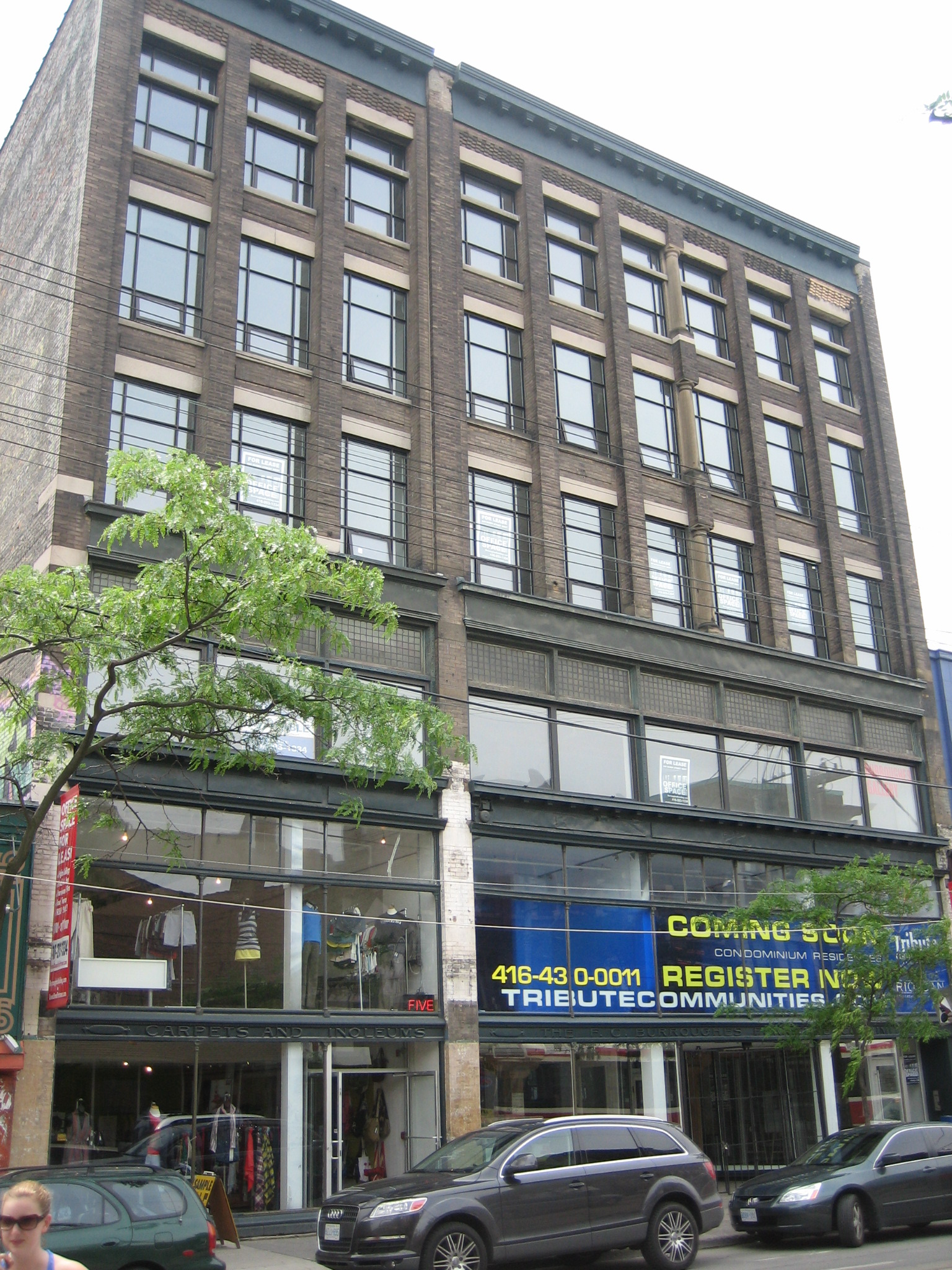
- The Burroughes Building
- Interactive map of the Burroughes Building area

General information
- Location: 639 Queen Street West, Toronto, Ontario, Canada
- Opened: 1907

The Burroughes Building is a commercial building in Toronto, Ontario, Canada. It was built in 1907, with an addition in 1910 to house the flagship department store for the F.C. Burroughes Furniture Company Limited.

The property has been renovated to preserve its character features. It has restored elevators, wood details, and exposed brick. The National Post stated that Queen Street Partners repositioned the Burroughes Building by bringing "gentrification (to Toronto) and spreading it... affecting more than just retail space."

The building used to be home to DesignRepublic, an independent furniture design and retail company, which occupied the first two floors. These floors will now be occupied by a Value Village Boutique. The third, fourth and fifth floors are office space, and the sixth floor and rooftop are used as event space. The original painted wall mural has been preserved by the 1910 addition to the east side of the property.
