= Fred Baier =

British furniture designer

Fred Baier is an avant garde British furniture designer and maker who has been working since the 1970s, when he graduated from the Royal College of Art and taught at what is now the Faculty of Arts (University of Brighton).

Some of his original work drew its influence from Industrial imagery concepts such as hydraulic pistons, bridges and electrical booster systems, and featured the use of brightly coloured stained woods. Since the 1970s, he has utilized convergent technologies including computers, mathematics, and theories of proportion in his furniture designs.

In 2011, Fred Baier was commissioned to create furniture for the library at The House of Lords and was invited to show retrospective furniture designs in a one-man show at the Crafts Study Centre.

In 2023, Baier was elected Master of the Art Workers' Guild.
