= Olav Eldøy =

Norwegian furniture designer

Olav Eldøy (born 1 November 1948) is a Norwegian furniture designer and interior architect from Stord, Norway. He was educated at the National College of Art & Design in Bergen in 1973. With a background in the furniture industry, he started his own practice as an interior architect and furniture designer in 1977. Some of his award-winning products include the chair Peel, the chair Date and the chair Eight, produced by the Norwegian furniture manufacturer Variér.

== Awards ==
- 2014- The Norwegian Design Council's mark of Good Design for the chair "Active"
- 2012- The Norwegian Design Council's mark of Good Design for the chair "Invite"
- 2009- The Norwegian Design Council's mark of Good Design for the chair "Eight"
- 2004- Furniture of the year in Norway – Sofa Vatne 116 – Elle Decoration International Design Awards
- 2003- Best Design product, Salon du Meuble, Paris for the chairs "Peel"
- 2003- The Norwegian Design Council's mark of Good Design for the chair "Date", nominated for the Award of Honour.
- 2002- The Norwegian Design Council's mark of Good Design for the chair "Peel", nominated for the Award of Honour.
- 2001- The Norwegian Design Council's mark of Good Design for the chair "REX"
- 2000- The Norwegian Design Council's mark of Good Design for the sofa "Europa"
- 1997- The Norwegian Design Council's mark of Good Design for the concept "Woody Shop"
- 1997- The Norwegian Design Council's mark of Good Design for sofa "Cox", manufactured by Fora Form AS
- 1995- Second prize in the Norwegian competition 'Wood without limits', "Theme 1: Home furniture in Norwegian hard wood with knots" for the chair "H&H"
- 1991- The NOR IN prize for sofa "Streamline", manufactured by Vatne Møbler AS, Vatne
- 1986- The Norwegian Design Council's mark of Good Design for the furniture series "Formula" in partnership with Steinar Hindenes

== Exhibitions ==
- 2008 "DesignER" - USF, Bergen
- 2007 "Norwegian chairs" - Travelling exhibition Oslo, Berlin, Wien, Stockholm
- 2006 "100% Norway in London"
- 2005 "Northern Lights" - Ozon Living Design Centre, Tokyo
- 2005 "100% Norway in London"
- 2004 "Design tur/retur" - Norsk Form, Oslo
- 2004 "Sofa med hatt, penn og kol" - Stord Kunstlag, Stord
- 2004 "Stol på klær" - Norsk Form, Oslo
- 2003-05 "Design from the Coolest Corner" - Travelling exhibition, Berlin
- 2003 "En reise i Norsk møbeldesign" - Jugendstilsenteret, Ålesund
- 2003 "Furniture exhibition" - Norsk Møbelfaglig Senter, Sykkylven
- 2002 "Sofa med hatt" - Kunsthåndverkerne i Kongensgate, Oslo
- 2002 "Sofa con sombrero en España", L'Alfàs del Pi, Spain
- 2002 "Form 2002" – Designers autumn exhibition, Norsk Form, Oslo
- 2001 "Källemo på Hylteberga" - Scandinavian Art, furniture and photography exhibition, Sweden
- 2001 "Blest" - Vestlandske Kunstindustrimuseum, Bergen
- 2000 "Skogsutstilling" - Norsk Skogbruksforening, Elverum
- 2000 "Sofa med hatt i Ål" - Ål Kunstforening, Ål
- 2000 "Sofa med hatt", Moster Amfi, Bømlo
- 2000 "Form 2000" - Designers autumn exhibition, Norsk Form, Oslo
- 1999 "Empty spaces" - Norwegian design exhibition / IFI, Sydney
- 1999 "Design Sydney 99" Norwegian design exhibition, Sydney
- 1998 "Børs & Kaviar", Sandvigske Samlinger, Maihaugen, Lillehammer
- 1998 "Sven Lunds Øga" - Scandinavian travelling exhibition
- 1997 'Arenum Designer Show', Bergen
- 1997 'Waves Norwegian Furniture Design' - International travelling exhibition
- 1997 "Design Nordic Way" - Scandinavian travelling exhibition
- 1996 'Arenum Designer Show', Bergen
- 1996 "Form 96" - Designers' autumn exhibition, Norsk Form, Oslo
- 1996 "Design Made in Norway" - Japan Industrial Design Promotion, Tokyo
- 1996 "Contrasts: Åke Axelson and Olav Eldøy, furniture designers" - Norsk Form, Oslo
- 1996 "MIL Design stand" (Norwegian Furnishings Manufacturers Association) – Scandinavian Furniture Fair, Bella Center, Copenhagen
- 1995 'Møbeldesigneren Olav Eldøy" - Exhibition at Sykkylven Center of Norwegian Furniture Profession
- 1992 "Sofa med hatt i fengsel" - Exhibition in the old prison at Stord
- 1990 "Sitt i nitti" - 90 Norwegian chairs. Exhibition in the Sandvigske Collections, Maihaugen
- 1988 "Norsk Form 88" - Challenger exhibition, Federation of Norwegian Design
- 1987 "Som det ser ut" - Design from Sunnhordland, Stord Kunstlag
- 1984/85 "Interior NÅ" - Furniture exhibition shown in the Museum of Applied Arts in Trondheim, Oslo, Bergen and Stranda
