= Paul R. Evans =

American sculptor

Paul R. Evans II (20 May 1931 – 7 March 1987), known as Paul Evans, was an American-born furniture designer, sculptor, and artist, who is famous for his contributions to American furniture design and the American Craft movement of the 1970s, and with his work with the influential American manufacturer Directional Furniture. His creation of metal-sculpted furniture set him apart. He studied at the Cranbrook Academy of Art, settled in New Hope, Pennsylvania, and, for a time, shared a showroom there with woodworker Phillip Lloyd Powell.

== Biography ==
Paul Evans was born in Newtown, Bucks County, Pennsylvania. He studied at several institutions, including the Philadelphia Textile Institute (1950), Rochester Institute of Technology, School for American Craftsmen, in Rochester, New York (1950), and Cranbrook Academy of Art, in Bloomfield Hills, Michigan (1952).

Settling in New Hope, Evans set up a collaboration with Powell. Without much money, the partners would get their wood from the reject pile of their neighbor, the woodworker and furniture designer George Nakashima.

In the 1950s, Evans began making copper chests and followed with sculpted steel-front cabinets. Evans had a two-man show in 1961 at America House, an exhibition held at the Museum of Contemporary Crafts in New York (now the Museum of Arts & Design). In 1964, Evans became a featured designer for manufacturer Directional Furniture. With Directional Furniture, Evans introduced several furniture lines, such as Argente series, Sculpted Bronze series, Sculptured and Painted Steel, Patchwork Copper, Pewter and Brass, and the popular Cityscape series. According to the New York Times, Evans "understood fashion, embraced youth culture and built custom pieces for celebrities like the ventriloquist Shari Lewis and the singer Roy Orbison."

Evans pieces were frequently signed, and some of the custom items have a signature and a date. Evans's combination of handcraft and technology anticipated the limited-edition art furniture of today. The artist's relationship with Directional Furniture set a unique standard for creative manufacture by insisting every piece be made by hand, finished by hand, and supervised by the artist at each step of production, one piece at a time.

On March 6, 1987, Evans shut down his business and drove to his vacation home on Nantucket. The next morning, he had a heart attack and died. He was 55.

In the 21st century, Evans's work ascended in reputation, making it among the most collectible in the design market. Gwen Stefani, Lenny Kravitz, and Tommy Hilfiger were reported to be among avid collectors. Evans cabinets and credenzas began to sell for more than $250,000 at auction. In 2014, the James A. Michener Art Museum, in Doylestown, Pennsylvania, staged a retrospective of Evans's work. In 2017, an Evans cabinet sold at auction for $382,000.
