= Katie Walker =

British furniture designer

Katie Walker (April 12, 1969) is a British furniture designer well known for combining simple components in her work. Her designs combine the function of the object with a sculptural interpretation of its structure. She works with craft and volume manufacturers and produces specific one-off commissions from a variety of materials.

== Education ==
She first studied Furniture and Related Product Design at London's Ravensbourne College of Design and Communication and went on to study for an MA in Furniture Design at the Royal College of Art.

== Notable work ==
As a furniture designer and business person (she runs Katie Walker Furniture), Katie designs pieces for batch production and for one-off commissions. Most of these pieces are made by Katie Walker Furniture.

Selected commissions include:

- 1993 Public seating for National Heritage, Bushy Park, Teddington
- 1994 Boardroom, reception and terrace furniture for Parallel Media Group plc, London
- 1996 Boardroom table and chairs, Prince's Trust headquarters, Regents Park
- 1998 Seating for Walsall Leather Museum
- 2000 Reception area seating, South East Arts, Tunbridge Wells
- 2000 Seating for Worcester City Art Gallery and Museum
- 2000,02 Public seating for Allied London Properties Ltd. The Swan shopping Centre, Leatherhead and St. Christophers Place, St. Albans
- 2002 Seating for Hove Museum & Art Gallery
- 2002 Altar, lectern and candlesticks for St. Nicholas' church, Arundel
- 2004 Reception desk and retail display for Farnham Crafts Study Centre

Award-winning pieces include:

- Ribbon Rocking Chair (winner of the Wesley Barrell Craft Award and both the Wood Awards Furniture and Innovation Awards in 2006)
- Weight and See Mirror (the original of which toured the UK with the "One-Tree" Exhibition)
- Gallery seating (holder of Guildmark 250 from the Worshipful Company of Furniture Makers)
- Eyers Dining Group – a private commission

== Exhibitions ==
- 1993 'Walk don't Walk', street furniture exhibition at Liverpools' 'Visionfest'
- 1994 The Hannah Peschar Sculpture Garden, Ockley, Surrey
- 1995, 96, 98 'Decorative Arts Today', Bonhams, London
- 1995, 96, 97, 98, 99, 01 '100% Design', London
- 1996,97 The Garden Gallery, Stockbridge, Hampshire
- 1996 'Living at Belsay', Belsay Hall, Northumberland
- 1996, 97 'Design Resolutions', Royal Festival Hall, London
- 1997 'The Garden', The Harley Gallery, Worksop
- 1997, 2002, 2004 The Grace Barrand Design Centre, Nutfield, Surrey
- 1997 'Almost Edible' Six Chapel Row Gallery, Bath
- 1998 The Hill House, Helensburgh, Scotland
- 1998 'Katie Walker Furniture' Hove Museum & Art Gallery
- 1999, 01 A Celebration of Craftsmanship, Cheltenham
- 2001/ 2002 'onetree': Royal Botanic Garden Edinburgh; Tenants Hall, Tatton Park, Cheshire; Bristol City Art Gallery; the Geffrye Museum, London
- 2002 Chelsea Crafts Fair, London
- 2004 'New Member Focus', Contemporary Applied Arts, London
- 2006 Collect
- 2006 Origin

== Personal life ==
Katie is married and has two daughters. She lives in West Sussex, UK.

She is a Fellow of the Royal Society of Arts, A member of Design Nation and a member of Contemporary Applied Arts.
