= Timothy Schreiber =

German furniture designer (born 20th century)

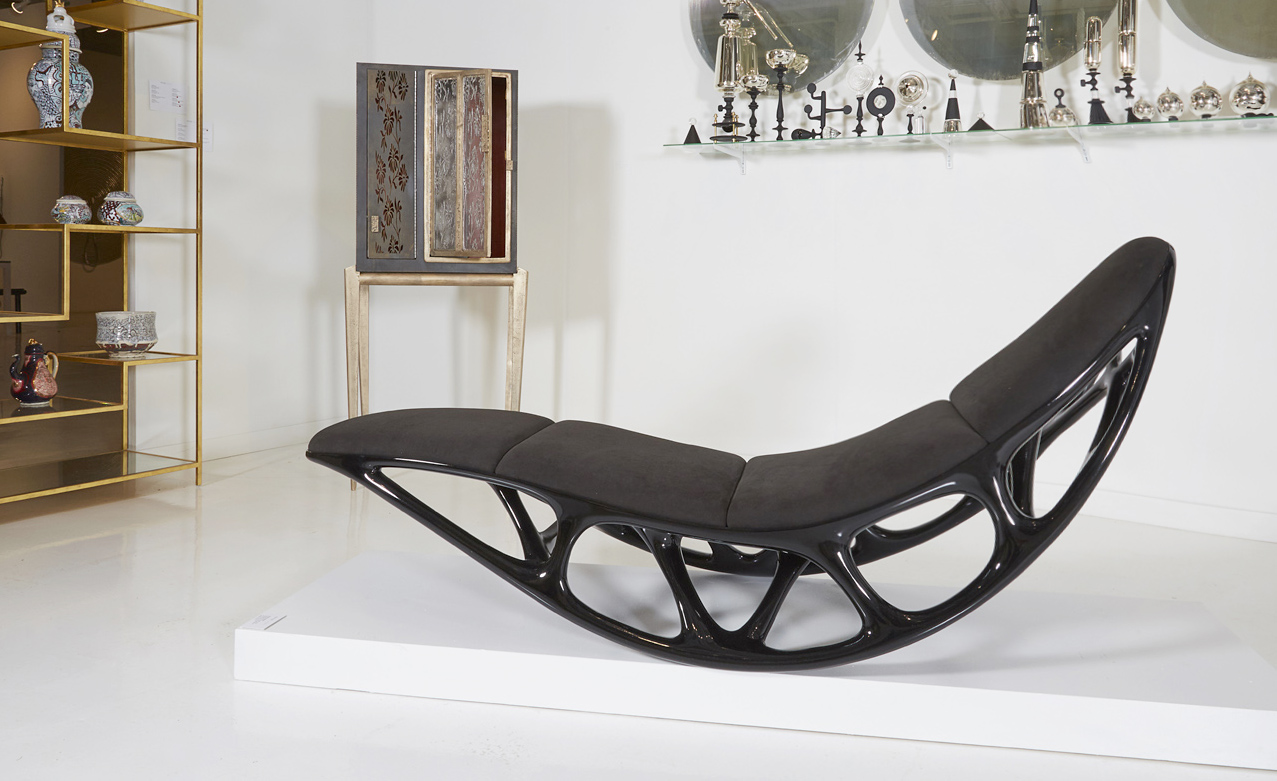
Morphogenesis Chaise, Wexler Gallery at Collective Design, New York, 2016

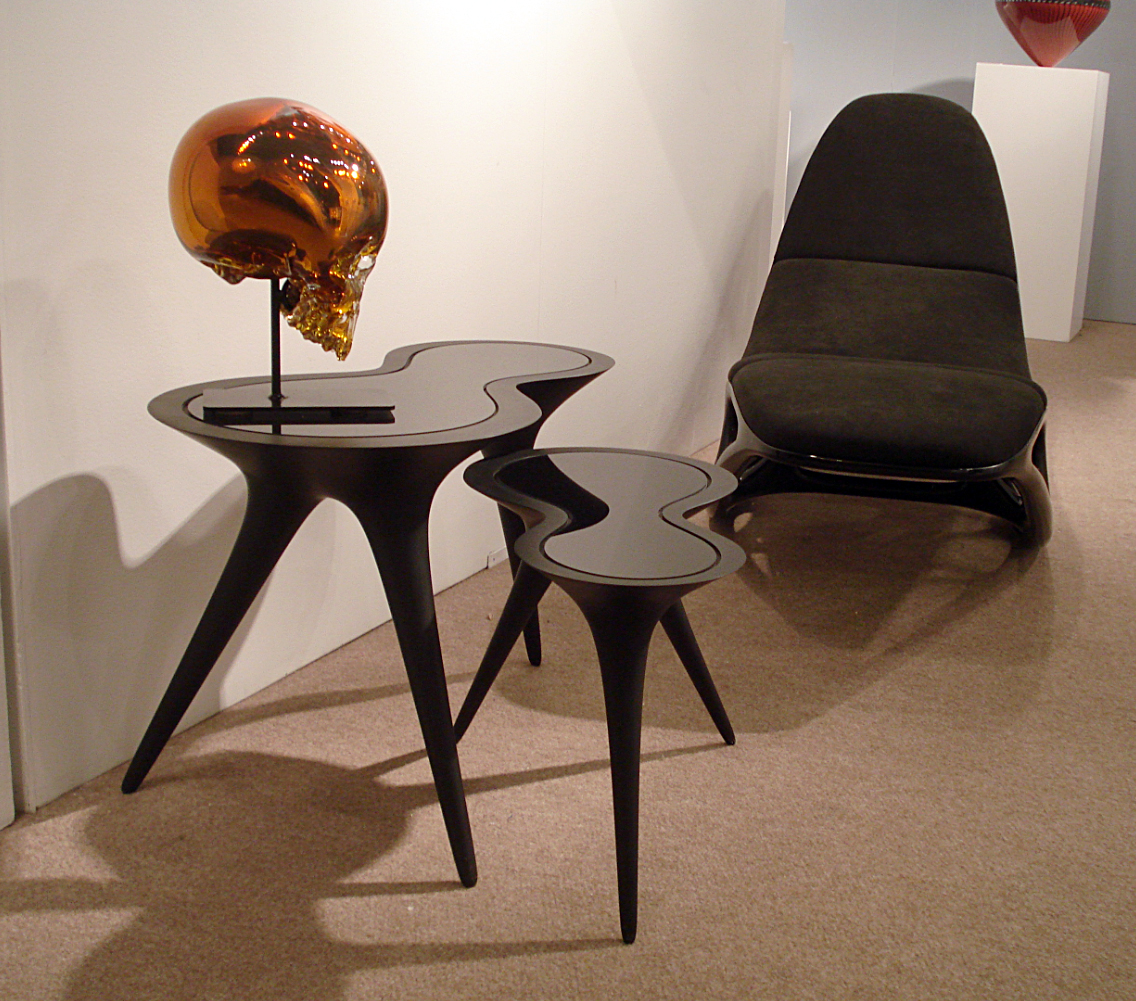
Black Ice Tables, Wexler Gallery, 2012

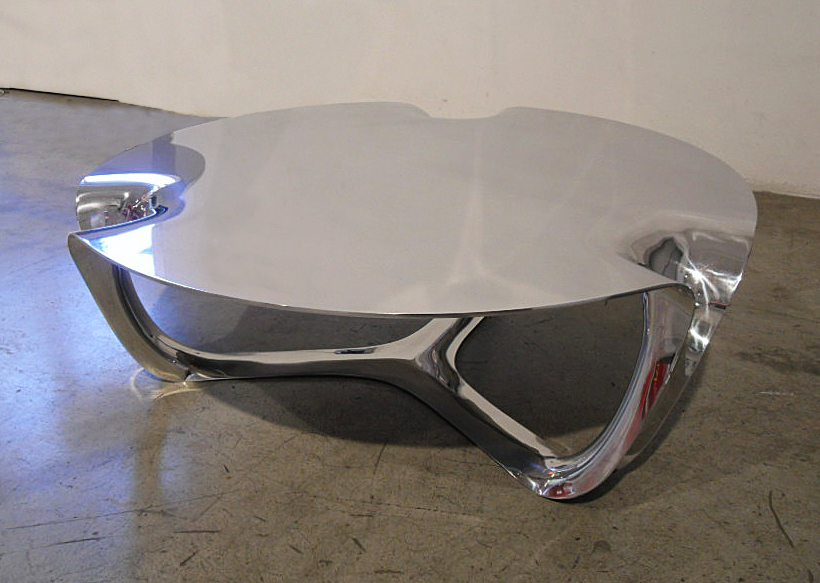
Flow side table, Wexler Gallery, 2009

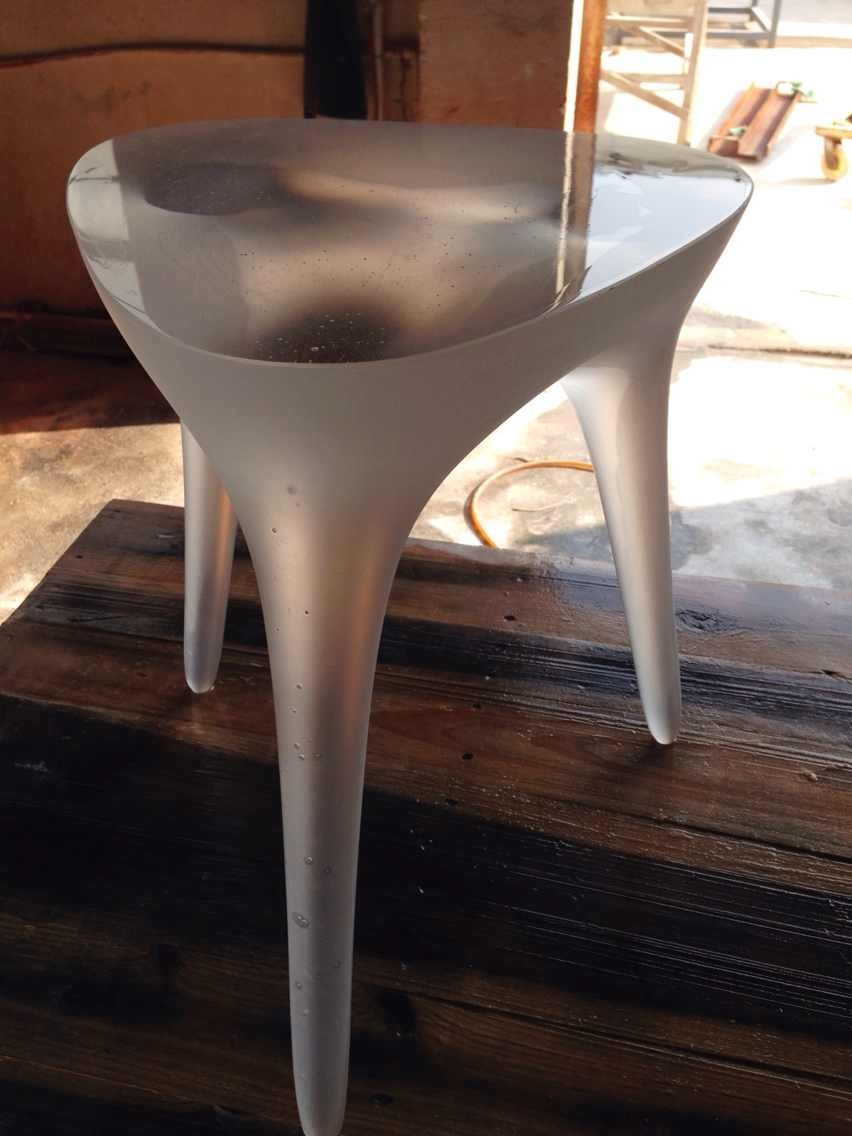
Icicle table, Wexler Gallery, 2013

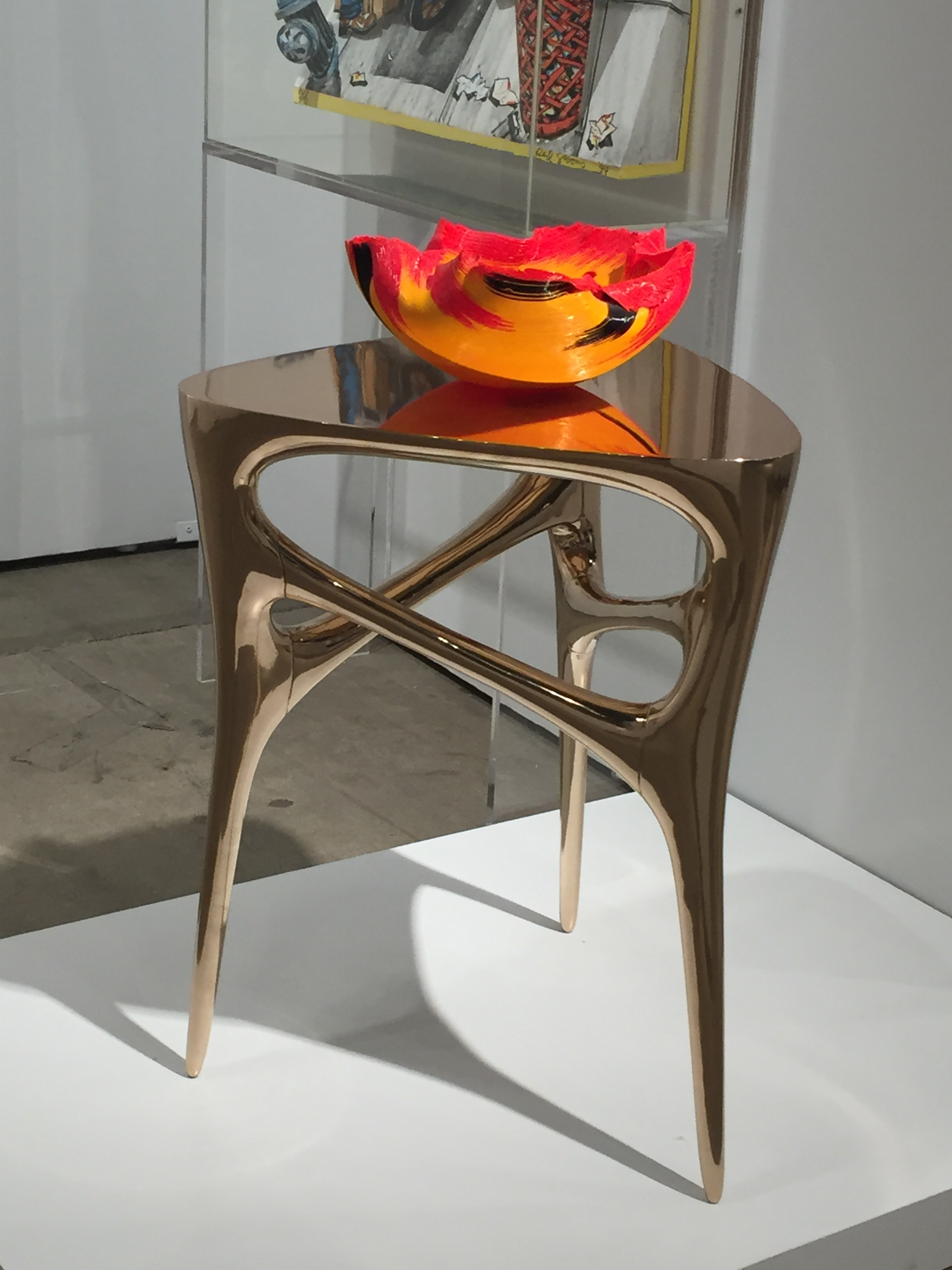
Methodology table, polished bronze, 2015

Timothy Schreiber (born 20th century) is a furniture designer, based in London.

== Career ==
In 2013, Schreiber started working in cast glass with his "icicle tables" being his first series of furniture in this material. He applied traditional glass casting technique to relatively large furniture designs.

His limited-edition items are represented by various galleries, including 88-Gallery in London.
