= Alan Peters =

British furniture designer maker (1933–2009)

Alan George Peters OBE (17 January 1933 – 11 October 2009) was a British furniture designer maker, and during his career was one of the few direct links with the 19th century Arts and Crafts Movement, having apprenticed to Edward Barnsley. Peters set up his own workshop in the 1960s, and has been described as "arguably Britain's foremost furniture maker".

== Biography ==
Peters was a main exponent of the 1970s British Craft Revival. His work was rooted in tradition and showed a deep understanding and respect for his material wood.

He is known for his particularly elegant furniture work, such as an adzed, fan-like table and a tabletop with a bowl carved into it. Although his work was influenced by Japanese woodworking, he rejected Japanese tools after experimenting with them. He favoured the No. 7 plane – a particularly large and heavy one – for nearly everything.

He published Cabinetmaking – A Professional Approach (re-published in 2009) and a revision (for the fourth edition) of Ernest Joyce's The Technique of Furniture Making.

In 1990, Peters was awarded the OBE for his services to furniture, and in 2002 was given an Award of Distinction by the American Furniture Society.

In 1998 Peters moved to Minehead in West Somerset. He died on 11 October 2009, aged 76.

== Legacy ==
In 2009 fellow furniture designer maker Jeremy Broun made a film and wrote a book called "Alan Peters – The Makers' Maker".

Since 2010, the Alan Peters Award for Excellence has been run as an annual award, established by Jason Heap, a designer maker and director of The Celebration of Craftsmanship and Design exhibitions. The award is open to furniture makers under 30 years of age and was set up to continue Peters' legacy.
