= Terence Main =

American sculptor (born 1954)

Fourth Frond Chair, cast bronze sculpture by Terence Main, 1991, Metropolitan Museum of Art

Terence Main (born 1954) is an American contemporary artist and designer.

== Education ==
He received his BA degree from the Herron School of Art and Design in 1976, and his MFA degree from Cranbrook Academy of Art in 1978.

== Career ==
Main is best known for the cast metal and stone sculptural furniture that he has been making for more than 30 years, such as Fourth Frond Chair in the collection of the Metropolitan Museum of Art.

== Solo exhibitions and commissions ==
- 2019 Peter Marino, My Eames is True, Louis Viuttton
- 2011–2015 Peter Marino, Five, cast aluminum bench for Christian Dior showrooms- Beijing, Shanghai, Florence, Hong Kong, Tokyo, Miami and other worldwide Dior showrooms.
- 2015 The Turning Line, Herron School of Art and Design, 2015 Distinguished Alumnus Award, Indianapolis, IN
- 2002 Terra Incognita, Installation at 143 West 26th Street, New York, NY.
- 1997 Guerrillas, Art et Industrie, New York, NY.
- 1996 Terrestrial Tale, Art et Industrie, New York, NY.
- 1991 Inflorescence, Art et Industrie, New York, NY.
- 1990 Exhibition Evolution: from New York, Manufactory Gallery, Tokyo.
- 1989 Apparitions, Art et Industrie, New York, NY.
- 1988 Hellbenders, Art et Industrie, New York, NY.
- 1983 The Future Isn't What It Used To Be, International Design Conference, Aspen, CO.
- 1982 Third Stream, Art et Industrie, New York, NY.

== Group exhibitions ==
- 2015 "Art et Industrie", exhibition and publication, New York, NY
- 2014 "Design Miami", Magen H Gallery, Miami, FL
- 2011 Highlights from the Modern Design Collection, 1900 To the Present, Part II, Metropolitan Museum of Art, NYC.
  Thinking Big: Recent Design Acquisitions, Brooklyn Museum, Brooklyn, NY.
- 2009 Magen H Gallery Opens New Space!, Magen H Gallery, New York, NY.
- 2008 Design Miami/New York, Magen H Gallery, New York, NY.
  Art Basel, via Magen H Gallery, Switzerland
  Design Miami/Basel, via Magen H Gallery, Miami Beach, FL.
  Design London, via Magen H Gallery, Berkeley Square, London.
- 2007 Structure Et Surface, Harris Lieberman Gallery, New York, NY.
- 2006 Design Miami/Basel, Miami Beach, FL.
- 2005 Modernism, Seventh Regiment Armory, New York, NY.
  Design Miami/Basel, Magen H Gallery Miami Preview, Miami Beach, FL.
- 2003 Significant Objects from the Modern Design Collection, Metropolitan Museum of Art
  Group Exhibition, Rosenberg + Kaufman Fine Art, New York, NY.
  The Sculpted Seat, Leo Kaplan Modern, New York, NY.
- 2002 Magnet, Yassine Art Gallery, Dakar, Senegal.
- 2001 A Century of Design Part IV: 1975-2000, Metropolitan Museum of Art, New York, NY.
- 2000 Important Postwar and Contemporary Design, Icon20, New York, NY.
- 1999 Summer Group Show, Leo Kaplan Modern, New York, NY.
- 1998 Agitating Utopia, Cranbrook Academy of Art, Bloomfield Hills, MI.
- 1997 Get Out, John Elder Gallery, New York, NY.
  Form Function or Metaphor, Paint Creek Center for the Arts, Rochester, NY.
  Sit on this, The Chair as Art, PBCC Museum of Contemporary Art, Lake Worth, FL.
- 1996 Form Over Function, Virginia Museum of Fine Arts, Richmond, VA. .
- 1995 Building the Collection, Cranbrook Academy of Art Museum, Bloomfield Hills, MI.
- 1994 Modern Furniture, Metropolitan Museum of Art, New York, NY.
- 1993 Modern Metalwork, The Metropolitan Museum of Art, New York, NY.
  Art and Application, Turbulence, New York, NY.
- 1990 The Humanist Icon, Ulrich Museum of Art, Wichita, KS; The Fralin Museum of Art, Charlottesville, Virginia
  Functional Art, New York, Brutus Gallery, Osaka, Japan. Mondrian auf der Tube, Foundation for Constructivist and Concrete Art, Zurich.
- 1984Works on Paper, Pompeii Gallery, New York, NY.
- 1983 Ornamentalism, Blanton Museum of Art, Austin, TX; Hudson River Museum, Yonkers, NY.
