= Russell Spanner =

Canadian furniture designer

- Born: 1916
- Died: 1974 (aged 57–58)
- Occupation: Canadian designer
- Known for: residential furniture design

Russell Spanner (1916–1974) was a Canadian designer who contributed to residential furniture designs in the 1950s.

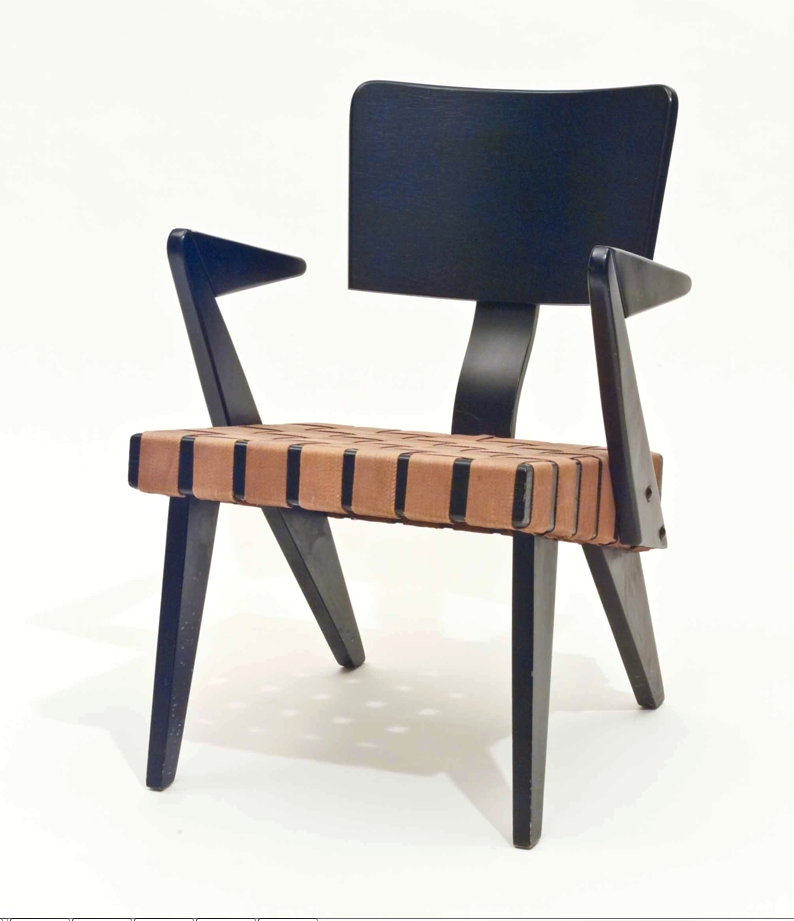
Lounge Chair with Arms, designed by Russell Spanner, 1950. Photo by Ernest Mayer, courtesy of the Winnipeg Art Gallery.

Spanner's designs included dining and lounge chairs, tables, and modular storage units. The designs were manufactured at Spanner Products Limited, the family-owned woodworking company in Toronto, Canada, which was founded by his grandfather. His furniture lines were sold and distributed at department store chains and independent merchants.

"The Ruspan Originals line was boxy and geometric, but most of all it was simple, functional and modern, all qualities that appealed to young post-war couples buying furniture for their new houses or apartments." Spanner's designs utilized innovative manufacturing techniques such as curved plywood and non-upholstered, woven-web seating. Many of the designs reused components and shared consistent proportions, which gave his work a characteristic aesthetic. Among his three residential furniture lines (Ruspan Originals, Catalina, and Pasadena) the Lounge Chair with Arms has been described as the "best-known and most desirable" design.

Spanner was an amateur wrestling champion, and was known to test the strength of his designs by jumping on them and throwing them across the factory floor.
