= Busk + Hertzog =

Danish furniture design team

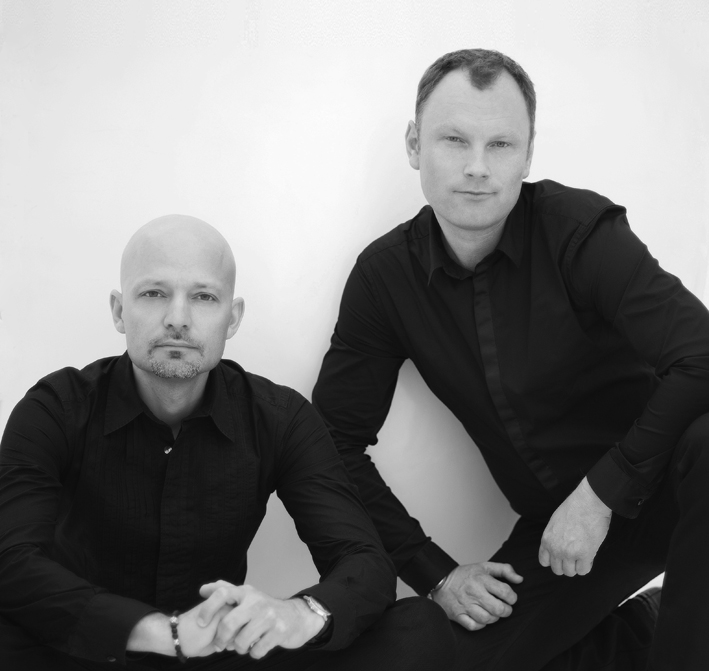
- Occupation: Architect
- Awards: Numerous; IF Awards 2008-2013; Good Design Awards 2008-2012; Red Dot Awards 2008-2010; Furniture Prize 2008
- Practice: London

Busk + Hertzog is a Danish design team created by Flemming Busk and Stephan Hertzog in 2000. They produce furniture designs. Both designers, Flemming Busk and Stephan Hertzog, are two of the most awarded Danish designers. They have won international design awards such as the Red Dot Awards, IF Awards, and Good Design Awards.

Busk + Hertzog is based in London, England. Many designs of the team have been exhibited at design museums internationally. They are also included in the Danish Design Museum database for historic Danish Design and all of their designs are listed in the museum's online library.

== History ==
Busk + Hertzog was founded in 2000 by Flemming Busk and Stephan Hertzog. Busk received a master in architecture and design from the School of Architecture in Aarhus, Denmark and Hertzog had experience in the textile industry. They met in Aarhus and have been designing together ever since. In the early years, Busk worked as the designer while Hertzog worked in a business capacity for the team. In 2010, the team moved to London in order to find new inspiration for their designs. They were awarded the "Furniture Prize" in 2008 at the Danish Museum of Art and Design in Copenhagen by the furniture industry in Denmark. The Furniture Prize . The prize, which was instituted by the Foundation of the Association of Furniture Manufacturers, was awarded for the first time in 1970. Among the previous prize recipients are prominent design icons such as Arne Jacobsen, Hans J. Wegner, Børge Mogensen og Poul Kjærholm.

The design duo was in 2004 among the Danish designers taking part in the Danish Design Project at MoMa, New York where their "Lotus" chair was selected by Museum of Modern Art (MoMa) curators for the project.

== Design style and influences ==
Busk + Hertzog's designs have been described as "clean" and "minimalist", yet sculptural, incorporating horizontal and vertical lines and geometric shapes. Their designs combine bold colours with clear indications of their Danish design heritage.

Busk + Hertzog develop their design ideas from physical research into furniture, and from examining shapes and lines in nature. They also visit locations where their furniture is in use in order to receive inspiration. Busk has been quoted as saying, "to be allowed to sit in all anonymity and see that our design was actually used, as we had thought, was very large. We are honoured to have prices, but we design furniture to be used by all, and therefore find it much more satisfying to meeting our products in real life."

== Designs ==
Busk + Hertzog have designed furniture for retail sales as well as for major companies throughout the world. Their work has been on display at the Royal House of Norway, the Museum of Modern Art in New York, the Norwegian Embassy in Helsinki, and the Carnegie Trust. Their designs are included in the Design Within Reach catalog which sells furniture both online and in stores in the United States. They have also designed furniture for CNN International headquarters in Atlanta, Georgia and Nordea in Stockholm, Sweden.

== Awards ==
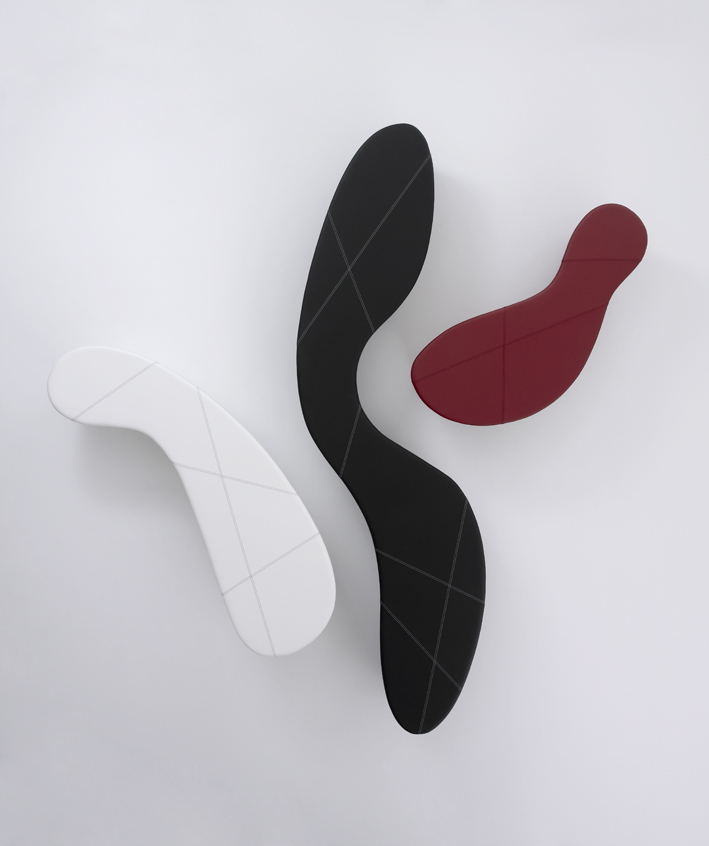
A range of upholstered benches inspired by the mobile of Alexander Calder, designed by Busk-Hertzog in 2007. Multiple exhibit locations.

Busk + Hertzog have won a multitude of awards since its inception. Some of the most notable awards include the Red Dot Awards, IF Awards, and Good Design Awards. Most recently, they were given the IF Product Design Award for their "Bubbles" design awarded by International Forum Design.

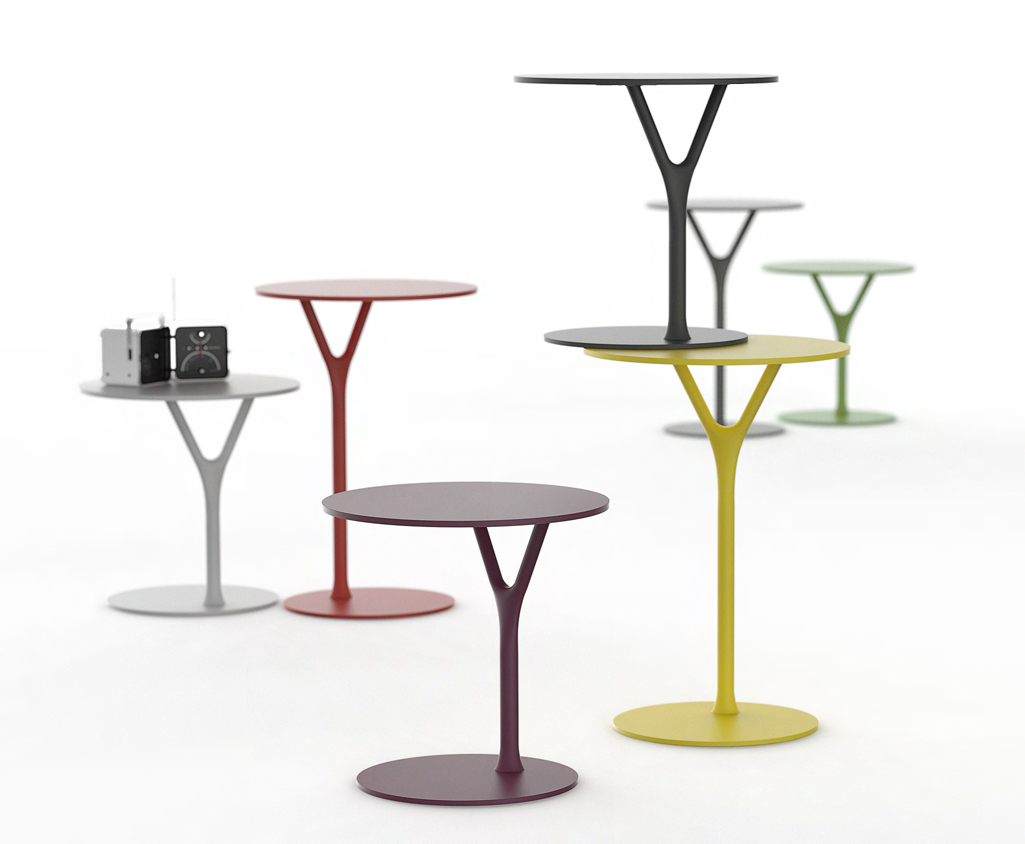
A satellite table inspired by the Wishbone, designed by Busk-Hertzog in 2010. Good Design Award Winner in 2010.

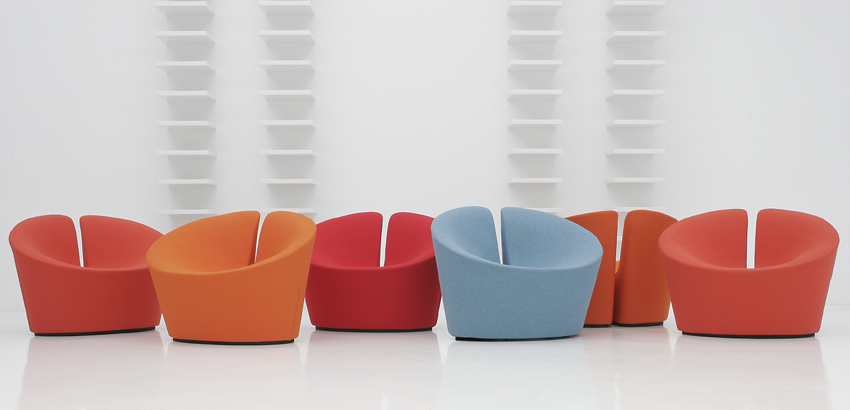
An upholstered lounge chair inspired by heart shape, designed by Busk-Hertzog in 2004. Sofa from design won Good Design Award in 2009.

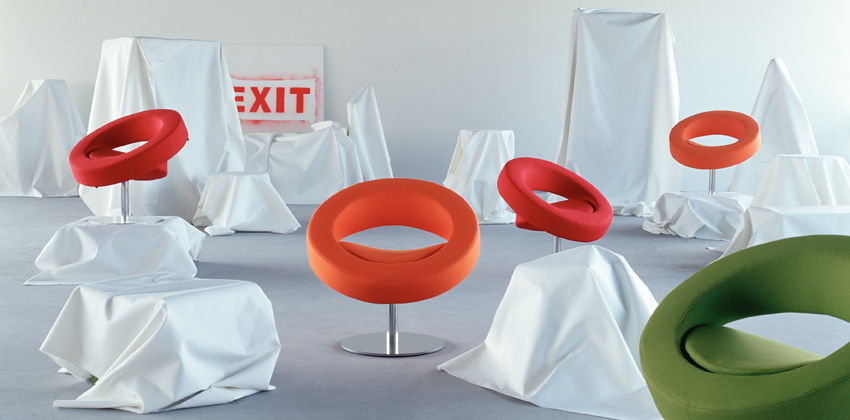
An upholstered lounge chair on swivel base designed by Busk-Hertzog for Danish Broadcast Corporation in 2002 and is today part of the permanent exhibitions at the Design museum in Copenhagen and Oslo.

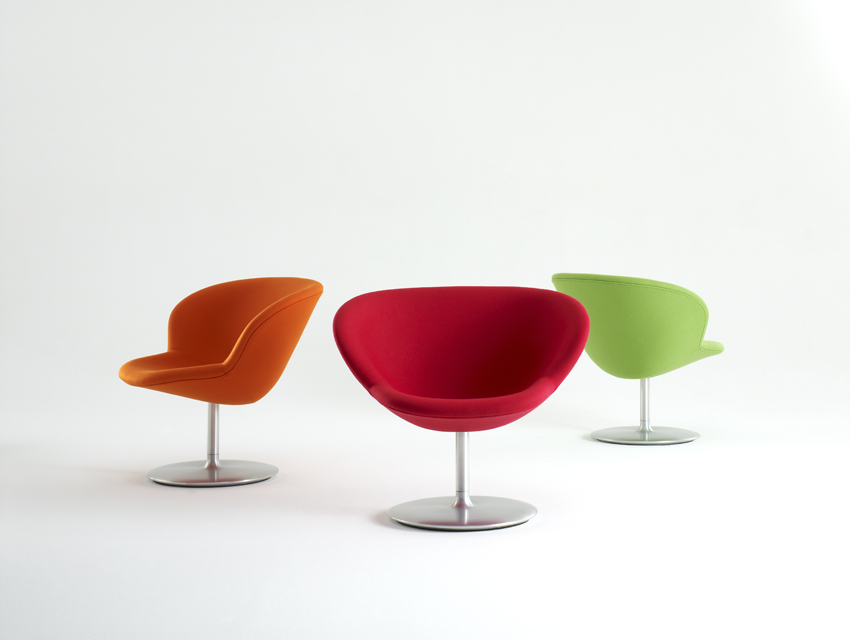
A lounge chair on swivel base inspired by a rose leaf, nominated for Federal Republic of Germany Design Award.

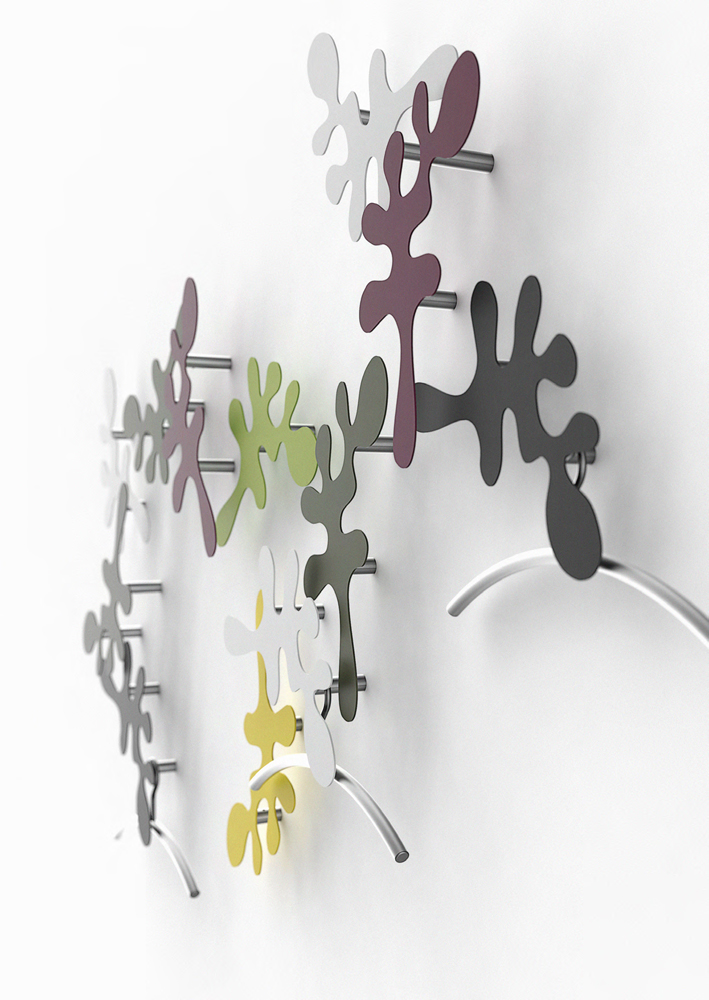
A coat rack which can be installed in individual configurations in 3 dimensions, designed by Busk-Hertzog in 2008.

- 2013 Red Dot Product Design Award 2013 for "Penny Coat stand"
- 2013 Red Dot Product Design Award 2013 for "Rada shoe rack"
- 2013 IF Product Design Award 2013 for "Bubbles"
- 2012 Good Design Award for ”Runway”
- 2012 Good Design Award for ”Didi”
- 2012 Good Design Award for ”Milo”
- 2012 IF Product Design Award 2012 for ”Didi”
- 2011 Good Design Award for "Penny"
- 2011 Good Design Award for "True Love Outdoor"
- 2011 Good Design Award for "Angel"
- 2011 Design Award 2012 of the Federal Republic of Germany nominee for ”Capri”
- 2011 IF Product Design Award for "Lulu"
- 2010 Good Design Award for "Wishbone table"
- 2010 Good Design Award for ”Lotus swivel”
- 2010 Good Design Award for "Lulu"
- 2010 Good Design Award for "Capri"
- 2010 Good Design Award for "Call Ottomans"
- 2010 IF Product Design Award 2010 for "Lotus swivel"
- 2010 Red Dot Product Design award 2010 for ”Wishbone table”
- 2010 Red Dot Product Design award 2010 for ”Capri”
- 2010 Red Dot Product Design award 2010 for ”Lulu”
- 2010 Red Dot Product Design award 2010 for ”Lotus swivel”
- 2009 Good Design Award for '"Gala Chair"
- 2009 Good Design Award for "True Love sofa"
- 2009 Good Design Award for "Jet chair"
- 2009 Good Design Award for "Door stops"
- 2009 IF Product Design Award for "Camouflage"
- 2009 Red Dot Product Design Award 2009 for "True Love Sofa"
- 2009 Red Dot Product Design Award 2009 for "Gala chair"
- 2009 Red Dot Product Design Award 2009 for "Door stops"
- 2009 Red Dot Product Design Award 2009 for "Sputnik Tables"
- 2008 Awarded “The furniture prize” by the Foundation of the Danish furniture Industry.
- 2008 Good Design Award for "Wishbone"
- 2008 Good Design Award for "Plasma benches"
- 2008 "Hello chair" selected for the permanent exhibition of Danish Museum of Art and Design
- 2008 Red Dot Product Design 2008 for “Wishbone”
- 2008 Red Dot Product Design 2008 for “Camouflage”
- 2008 IF Product Design Award 2008 for "Plasma"
- 2007 "Hello chair" selected for the permanent exhibition of National Gallery / Design museum, Oslo, Norway
- 2004 Nominated to the ”Bo Bedre Design Award” “True Love” chair

== See also ==
- Danish design
- Modern furniture
- List of furniture designers

== Gallery ==
Select Images of Busk + Hertzog designs.

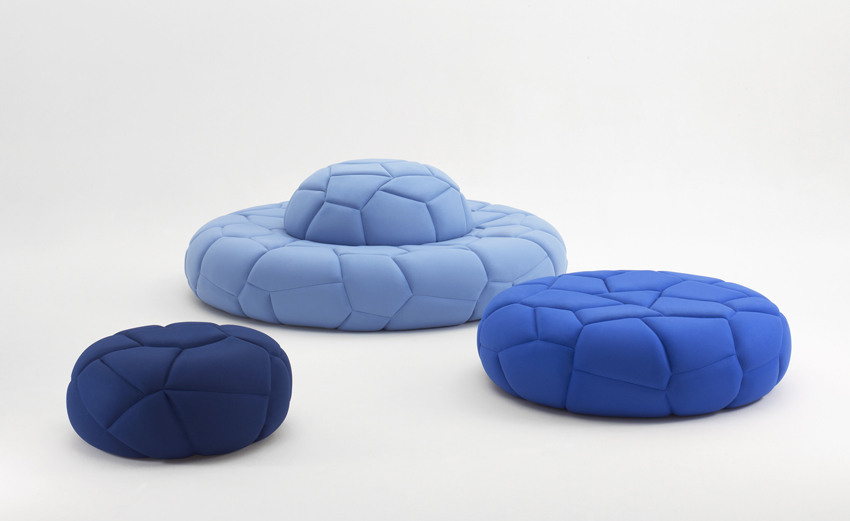
A range of upholstered lobby furniture inspired by soap bubbles, created by Busk-Hertzog

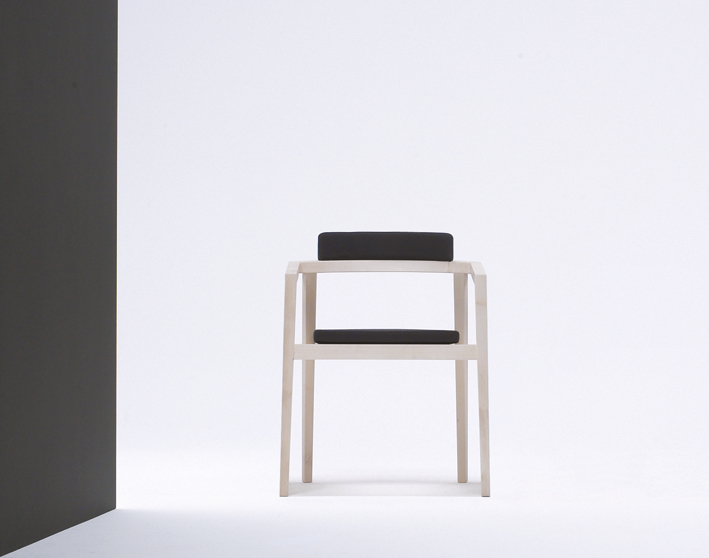
A wooden chair with upholstery and with focus on stacking abilities, designed by Busk-Hertzog in 2003.

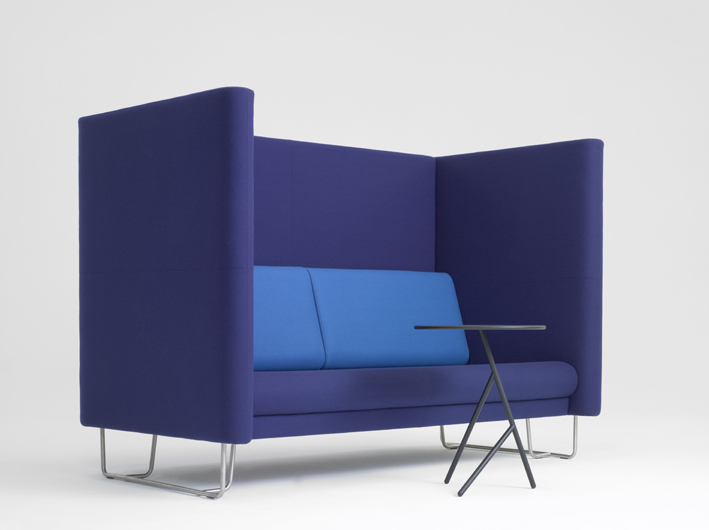
A sofa with high arms/seat back for meetings and or extra privacy in public spaces, designed by Busk-Hertzog in 2011.

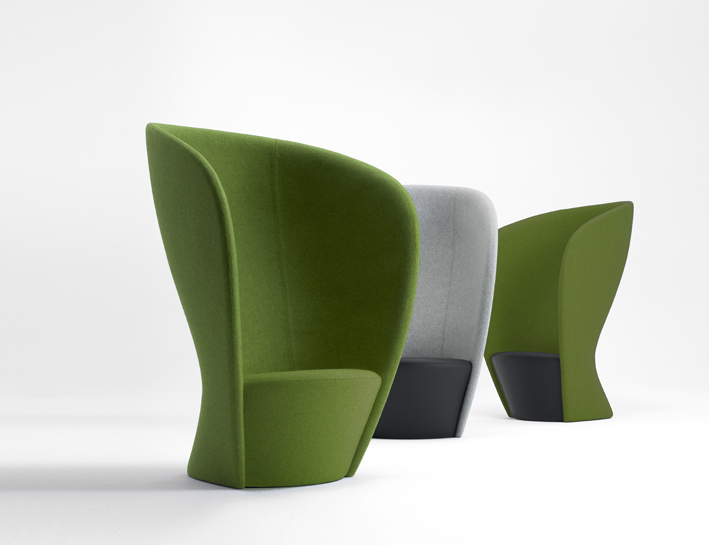
An upholstered lounge chair designed for privacy in public spaces, designed by Busk-Hertzog in 2011.

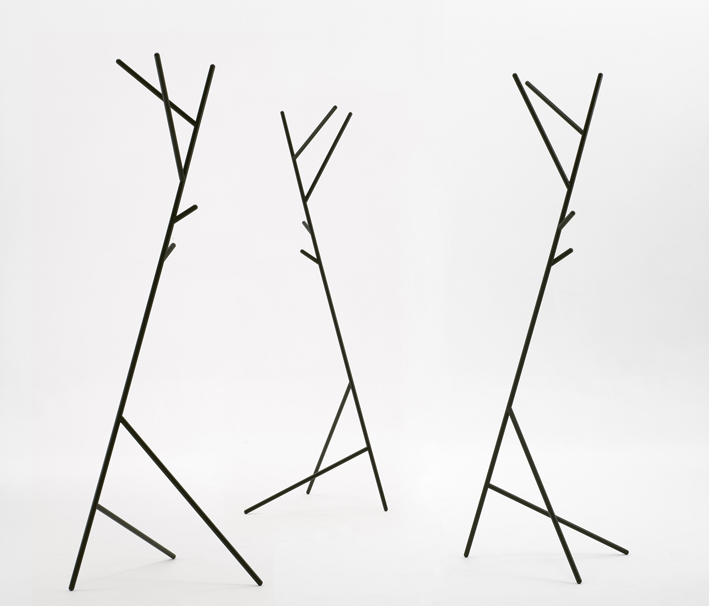
A coat stand looking different from every viewing angle inspired by tree branches, designed by Busk-Hertzog in 2012.

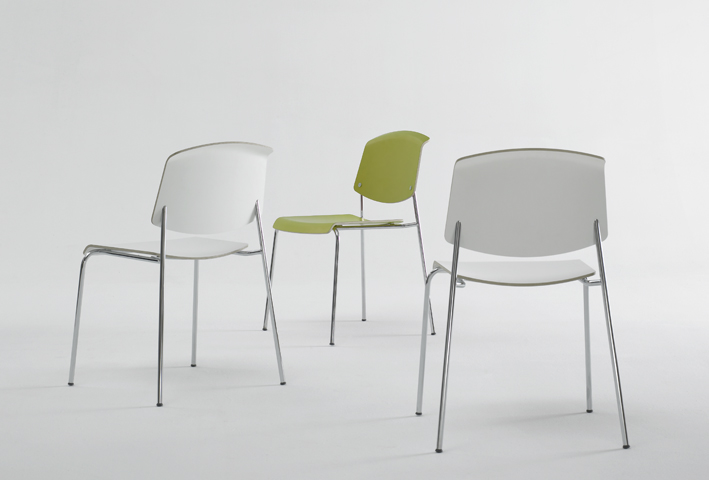
A stackable chair designed with focus on the back of the chair as this is the most viewed angle, designed by Busk-Hertzog in 2005.

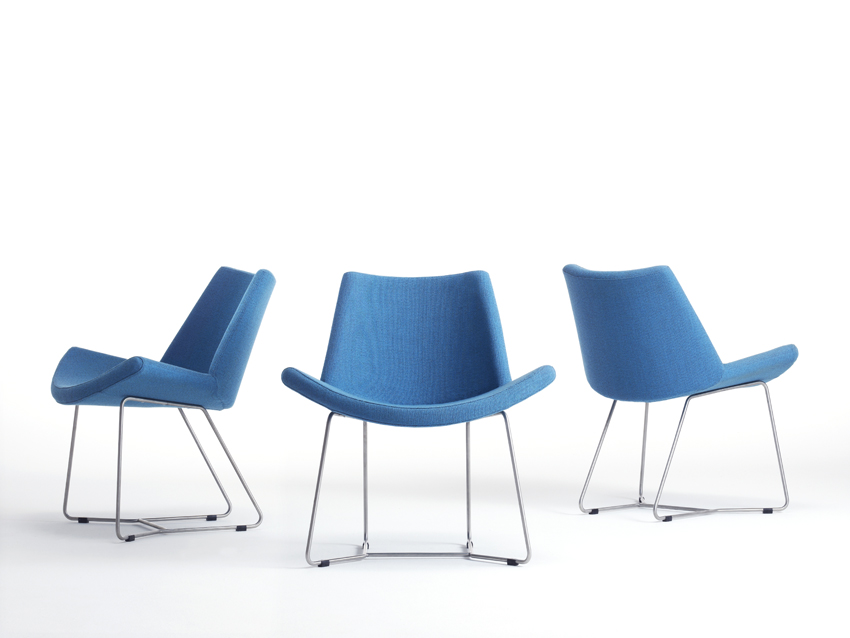
An upholstered lounge chair inspired by the Lotus position and part of the Danish Design Project at MoMa, New York, designed by Busk-Hertzog in 2003.

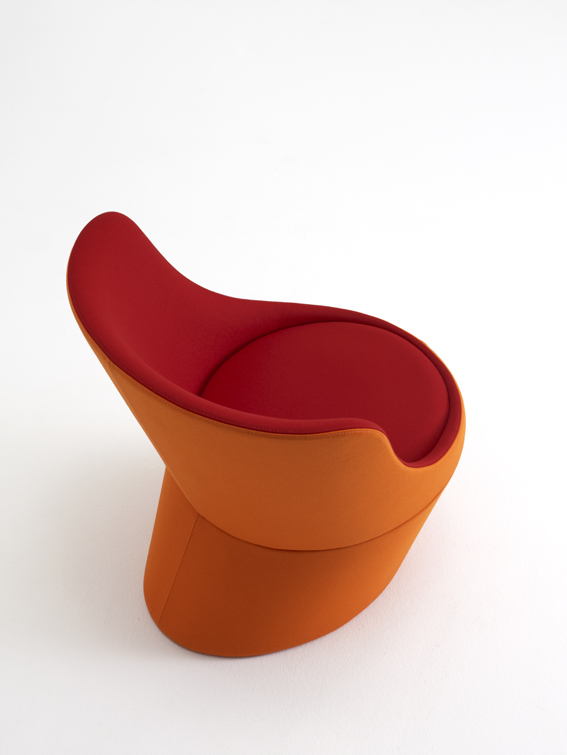
Didi chair designed by Busk + Hertzog in 2011.

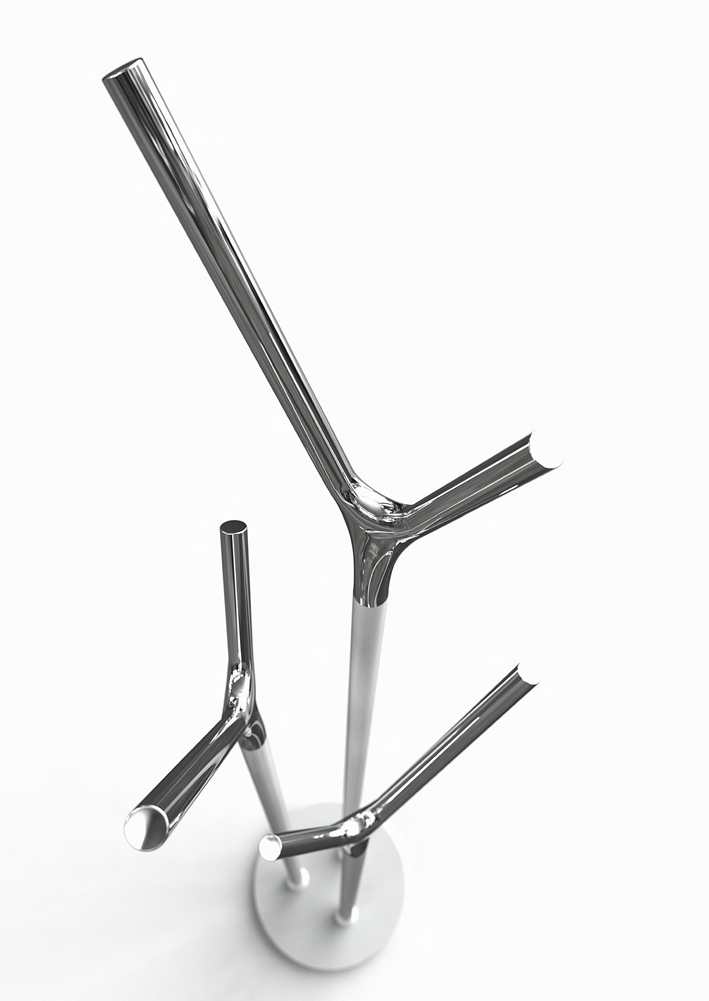
Wishbone designed by Busk Hertzog in 2008 - coat stand inspired by the wishbone (part of a range).

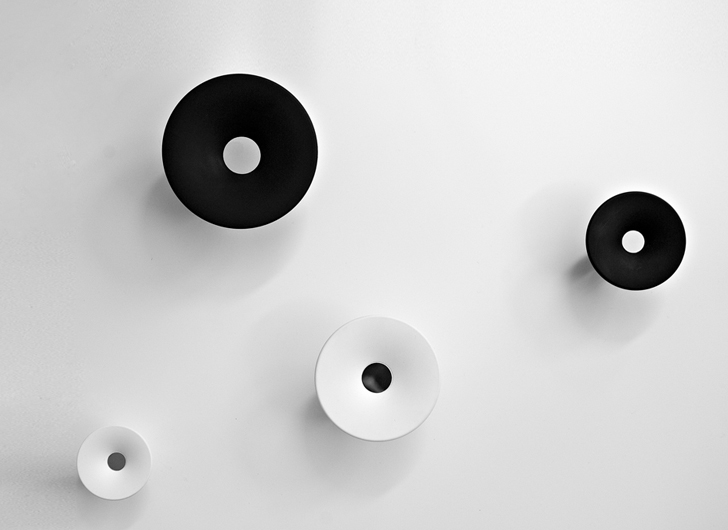
"Lulu" designed by Busk Hertzog in 2010 - coat hooks in various materials.

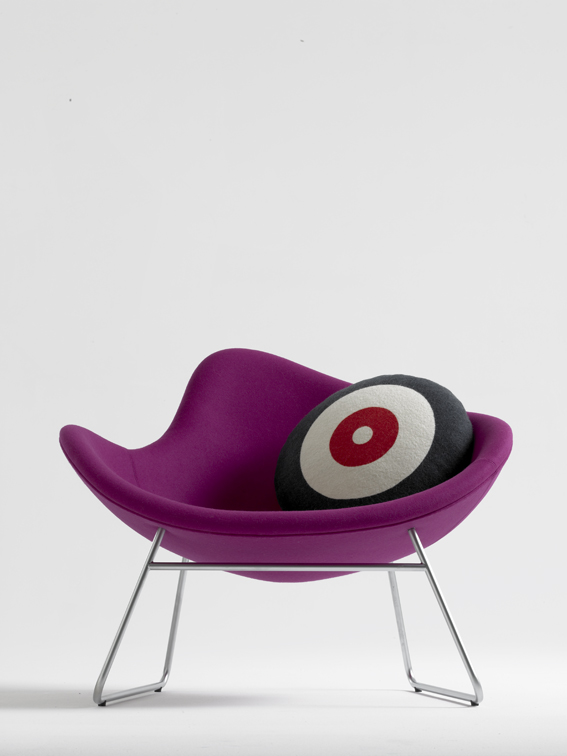
K2 designed by Busk Hertzog in 2005 - a asymmetric lounge chair where the user can sit in various seating positions.

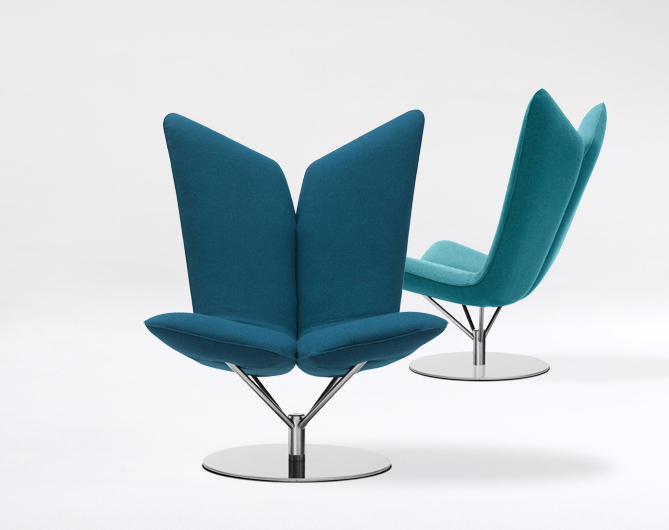
Angel designed by Busk Hertzog in 2011 - a lounge chair on a swivel base.
