= Jeremy Broun =

British furniture designer-maker, author, and filmmaker

- Occupations: Furniture designer-maker, author, filmmaker
- Website: www.jeremybroun.co.uk

Jeremy Broun is a British furniture designer-maker, woodworking author, filmmaker, and creative educator based in Bath, England. Active since the early 1970s, he was part of the 1970s British Craft Furniture Revival. His work is guided by a modernist "less is more" philosophy, drawing influence from Finnish and Italian design.

Broun began his career as a full-time independent furniture designer-maker in the early 1970s, with a style rooted in material integrity. In 1980, he was invited to submit a cabinet for the Sotheby's First Sale of Contemporary British Crafts, which was sold to a private collector. That same year, he was elected to the Crafts Council Index of Selected Makers.

In the mid-1980s, Broun was invited by the Crafts Council to submit two of his furniture designs among ten chosen from the United Kingdom for a Royal Family viewing at Kensington Palace, initiated by the then Prince Charles and Lady Diana.

A long-time advocate for sustainable design, in 1990 Broun was one of five makers given an ash tree from the Great Storm of 1987 by Kew Gardens to create contemporary furniture pieces — an early example of environmentally conscious making in British craft.

== Books and writing ==
Broun has authored several woodworking books, many commissioned by major publishers. His best-known title, The Encyclopedia of Woodworking Techniques, won a UK Top Authors Award in 1993 and was revised in 2018. Other titles include The Incredible Router (1989), Electric Woodwork, and Woodwork Now.

== Related books ==
- The Technique of Furniture Making – 4th edition by Ernest Joyce (the Woodworkers Bible)
- An Encyclopedia of Tables by Simon Yates
- An Encyclopedia of Chairs by Simon Yates
- La Défonceuse montée en fixe by Bruno Meyer, 2001

== Films and documentation ==
In 1988, Broun established Thinking Hand Video, a platform documenting the British furniture designer-maker movement. He has produced biographical films on key figures such as Alan Peters and John Makepeace. His DVD series, Furniture Today, continues to document contemporary makers, studio processes, and design thinking.

== Awards and recognition ==
Broun has received national awards for design, writing, and film making, including a Travelling Fellowship from the Winston Churchill Memorial Trust. The Worshipful Company of Furniture Makers Ambrose Heal Award. He was invited to become a Fellow of the Royal Society of Arts (FRSA) for his contribution to creative industries. He authored the article The Value of the Practical Arts in Education and Society for the RSA Journal. In 2009, he served as a freelance inspector for the British Accreditation Council for Independent Higher Education.

== Later work ==
Today, Broun divides his time between occasional furniture making, guitar design, writing, and curating The Alan Peters Furniture Award. He founded the Jeremy Broun Academy of Wood, an online archive and educational platform.
