= Marcus Nonnenmacher =

Cabinet maker (1653–1720)

Marcus Nonnenmacher (1653–1720) was a cabinet-maker for the Prague royal court.

He was born in Constance, the son of a German cabinet-maker he became in 1677 citizen of Prague, where he married into the family of the court cabinet-maker Abraham Stolz.

His Der architektonische Tischler oder Pragerisches Säulenbuch, printed in Nuremberg, 1710, is a furniture pattern book which included altars, cartouches, chairs, tables, beds, cradles, overmantels, and cupboards, all in a rich acanthus style. A second edition appeared in 1751.

Nonnenmacher died in Prague.

== Pattern Book ==
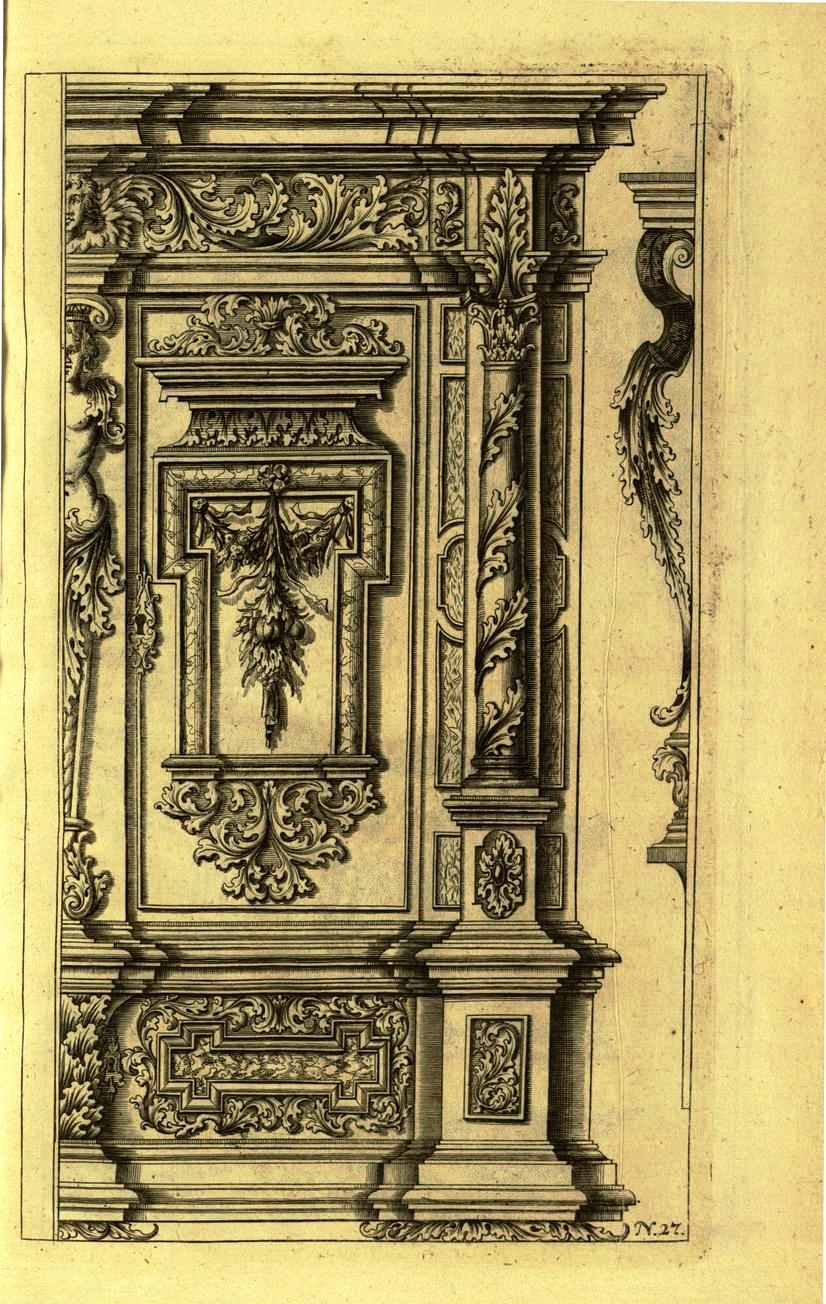

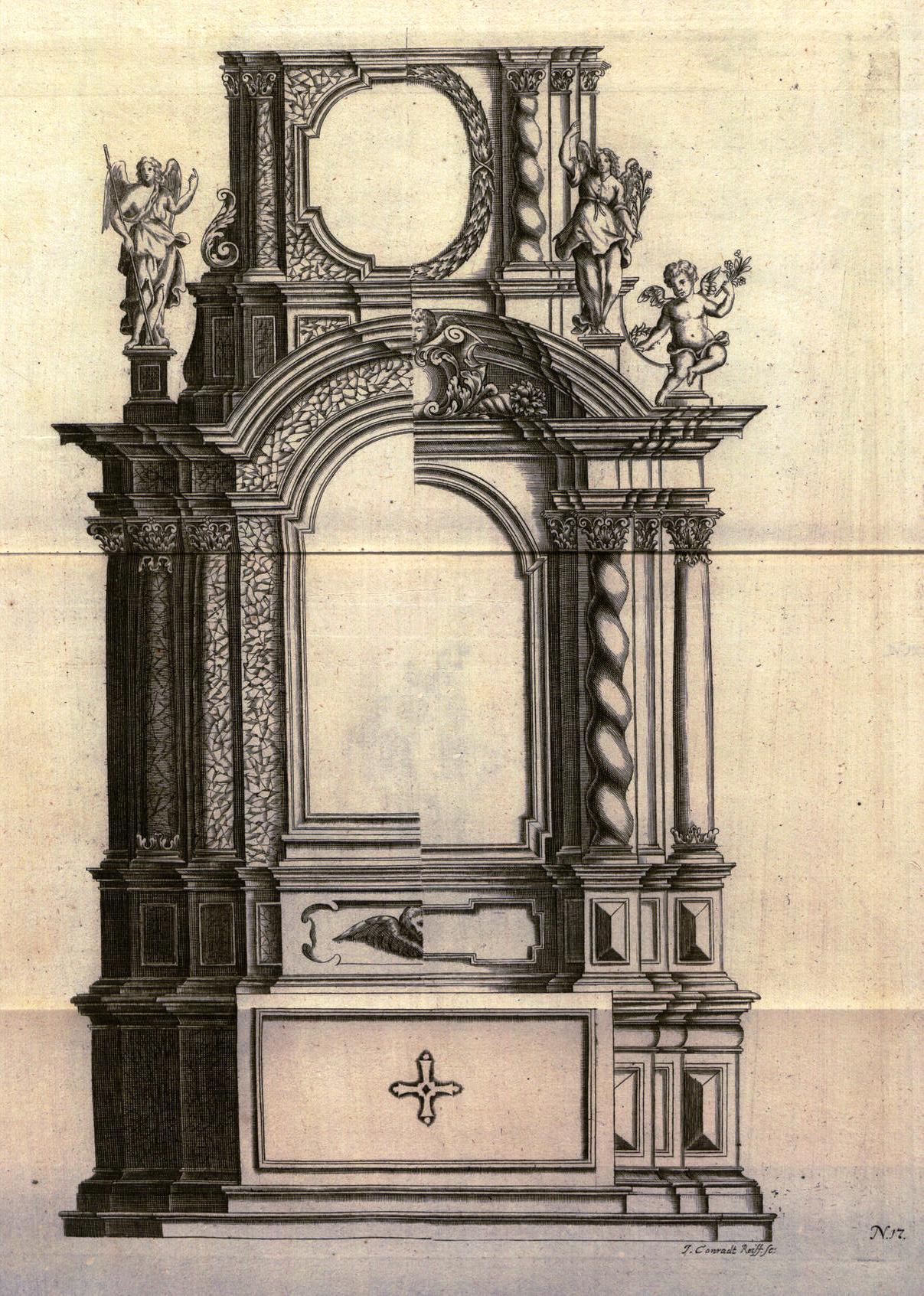

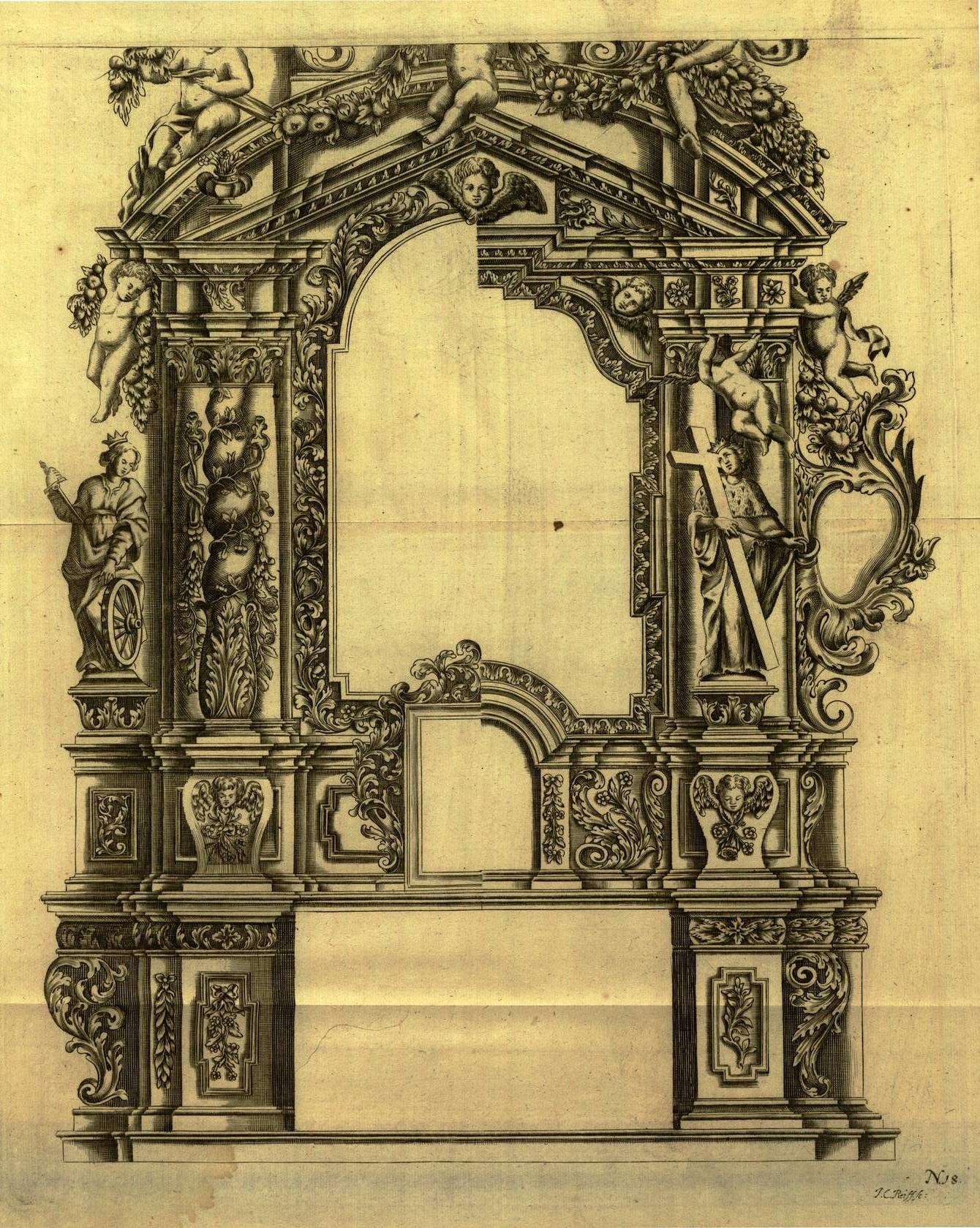

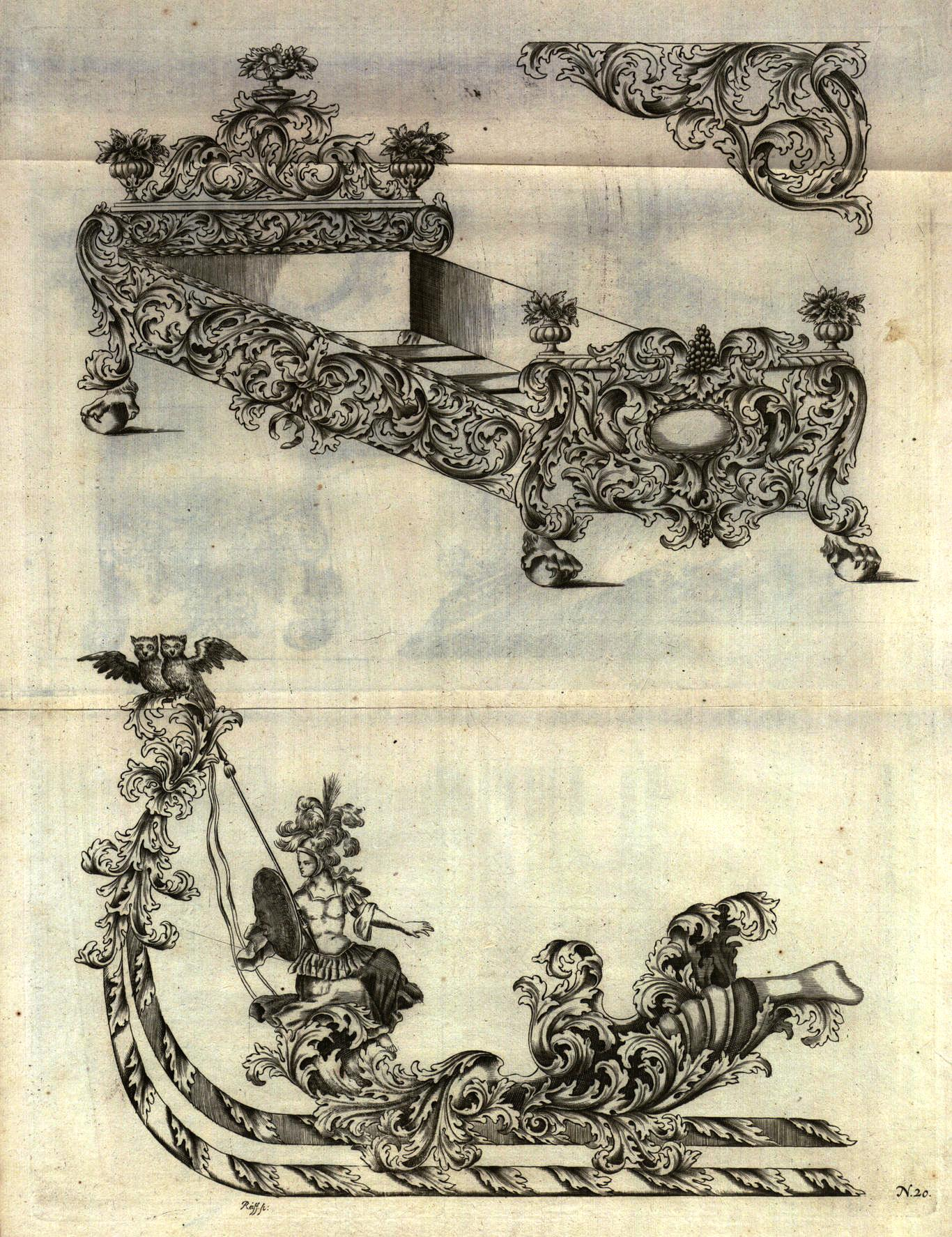

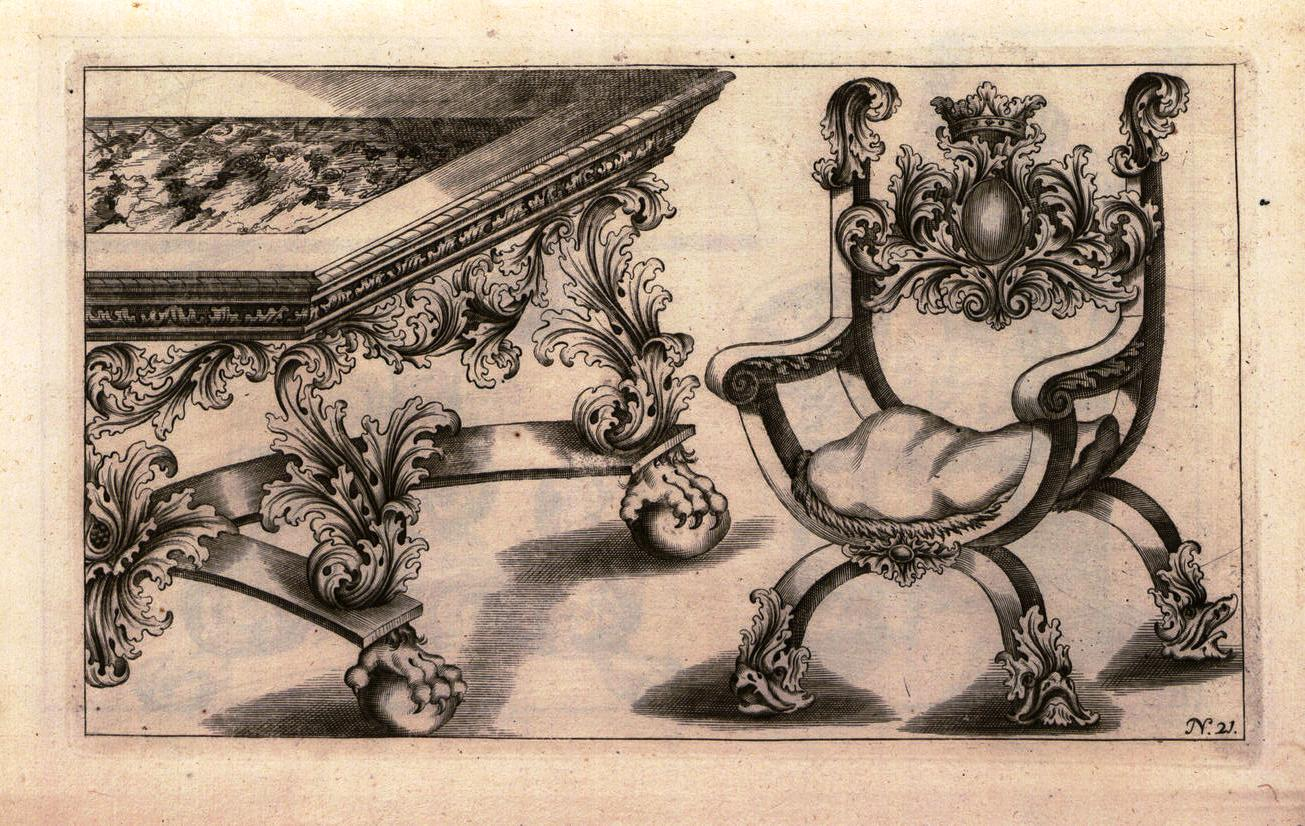

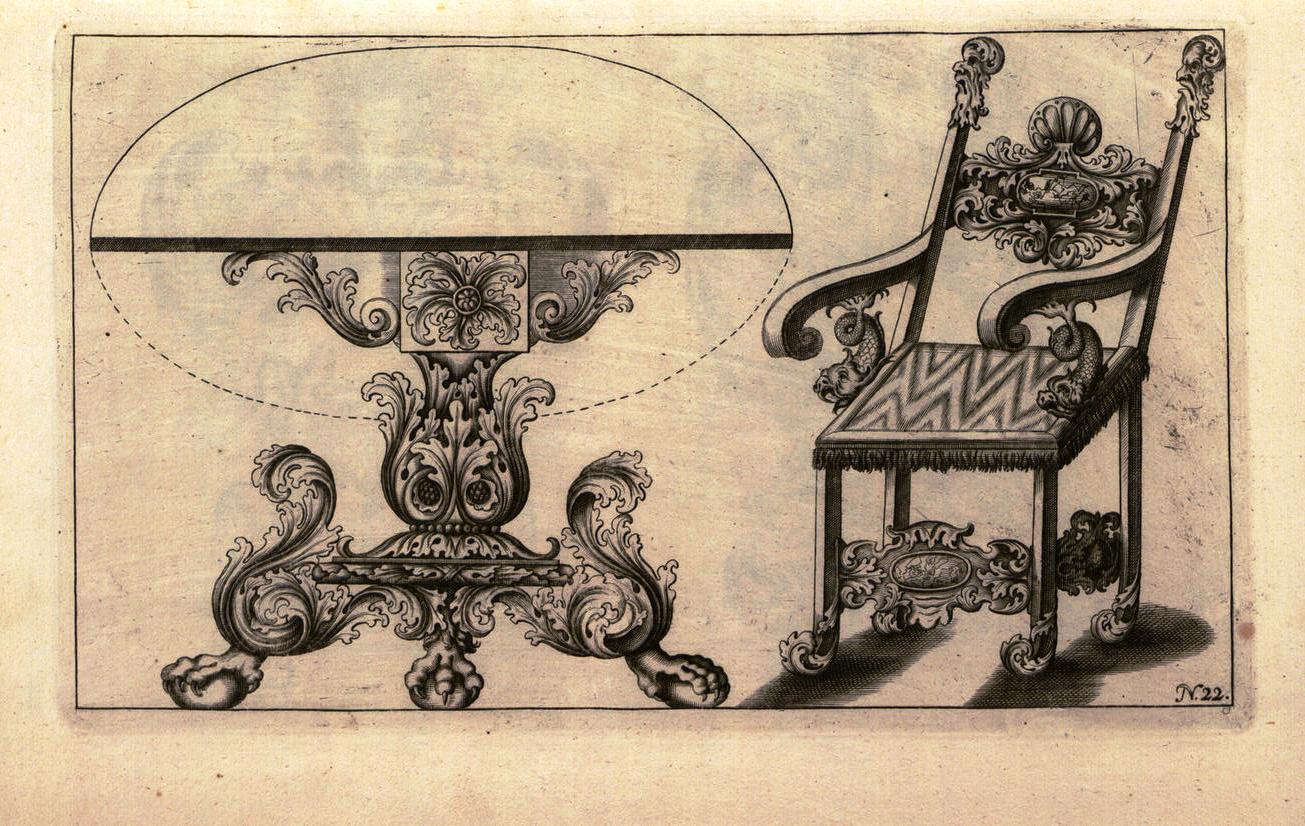

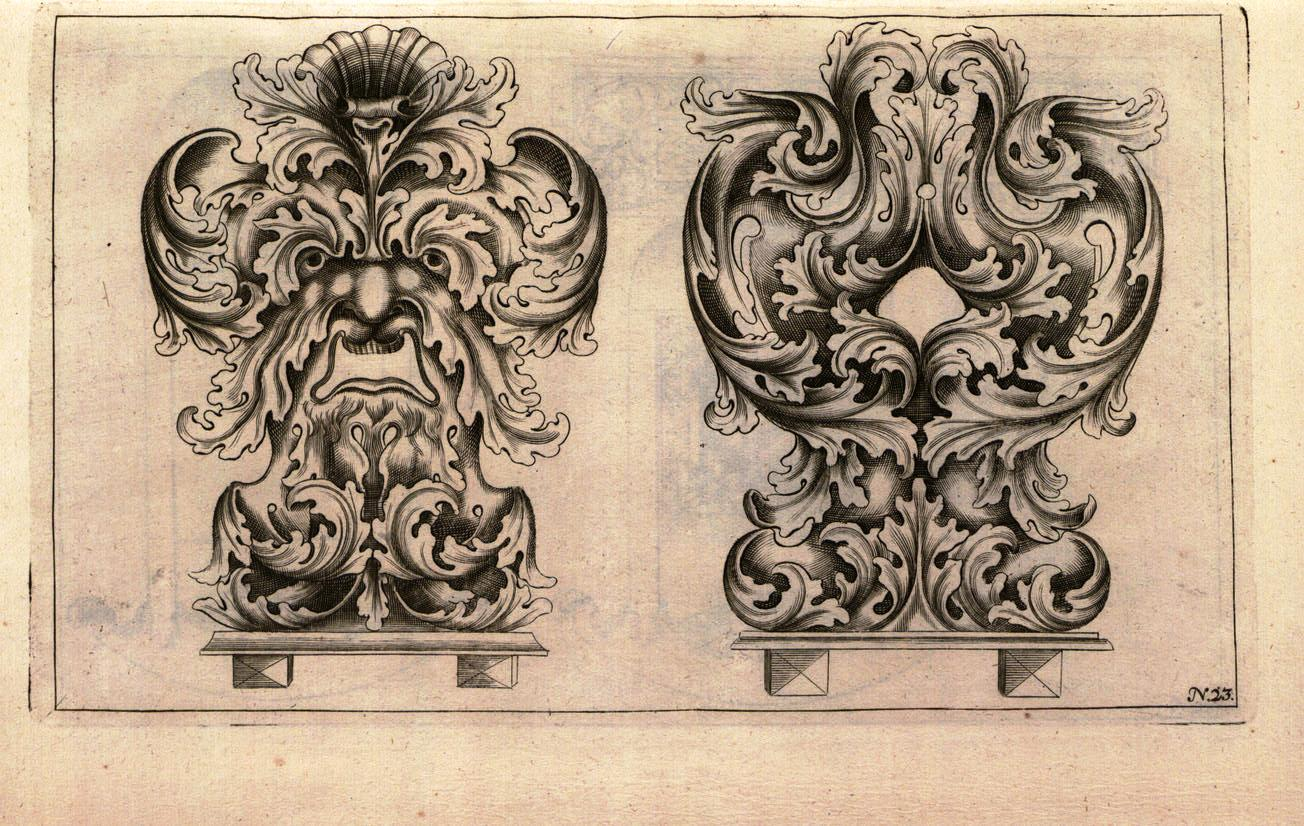
