= Henry Copeland (furniture designer) =

Henry Copeland, or Henry Copland, (c. 1710 – 1754) was an 18th-century English cabinetmaker and furniture designer. In partnership with Mathias Locke during the mid-18th century in London, they produced many furniture designs in the Rococo Furniture Style. However both men worked for Thomas Chippendale the elder and many of their designs appear, without acknowledgement, in his book of designs, The Gentleman and Cabinet Makers Director, published two years later. However a study of the original drawings suggests that they may have actively collaborated with Chippendale on his book.

Copeland appears to have been the first manufacturing cabinetmaker who published designs for furniture. A New Book of Ornaments appeared in 1746, but it is not clear whether the engravings with this title formed part of a book, or were issued only in separate plates; a few of the latter are all that are known to exist. Between 1752 and 1769 several collections of designs were produced by Copeland in conjunction with Matthias Lock; in one of them Copeland is described as of Cheapside. Some of the original drawings are in the National Art Library at the Victoria and Albert Museum. Copeland was probably the originator of a peculiar type of chair back, popular for a few years in the middle of the 18th century, consisting of a series of interlaced circles. Much of his work has been attributed to Thomas Chippendale, and it is certain that one derived many ideas from the other, but which was the originator and which the copyist is by no means clear. He died in 1754, and on 8 October his apprentice was handed over to his widow Elizabeth, who continued his business in his name.
