= Muriel Coleman =

American designer

Muriel Evelyn Coleman
- Born: 1917
- Died: 2003 (aged 85–86)
- Known for: Furniture Design

Muriel Evelyn Coleman (1917–2003) was an American designer who was a member of the Pacific Design Group based in California. She designed furniture through the material scarcity of post-World War II, and used rebar, metal rods and strips in her minimalist designs. Her works were included in the Autry National Center's California’s Designing Women, 1896–1986 exhibition.

Coleman received her MFA from Teachers College, Columbia University and studied in Paris with Andre Lhote. During World War II, prior to the invasion of Normandy, she helped decipher photographs of the French coastline while working for the forerunner of the CIA. She was President of the East Bay Artists' Association.
