= Nordell =

Nordell is a surname. Notable people with the surname include:

- Anna Nordell (born 1982), Swedish singer
- Jessica Nordell, American writer
- Melissa Nordell, Swedish fashion model
- Peter Nordell (born 1966), American rower
- Vera Rózsa-Nordell (1917–2010), Hungarian singer
