= Ferdinand Plitzner =

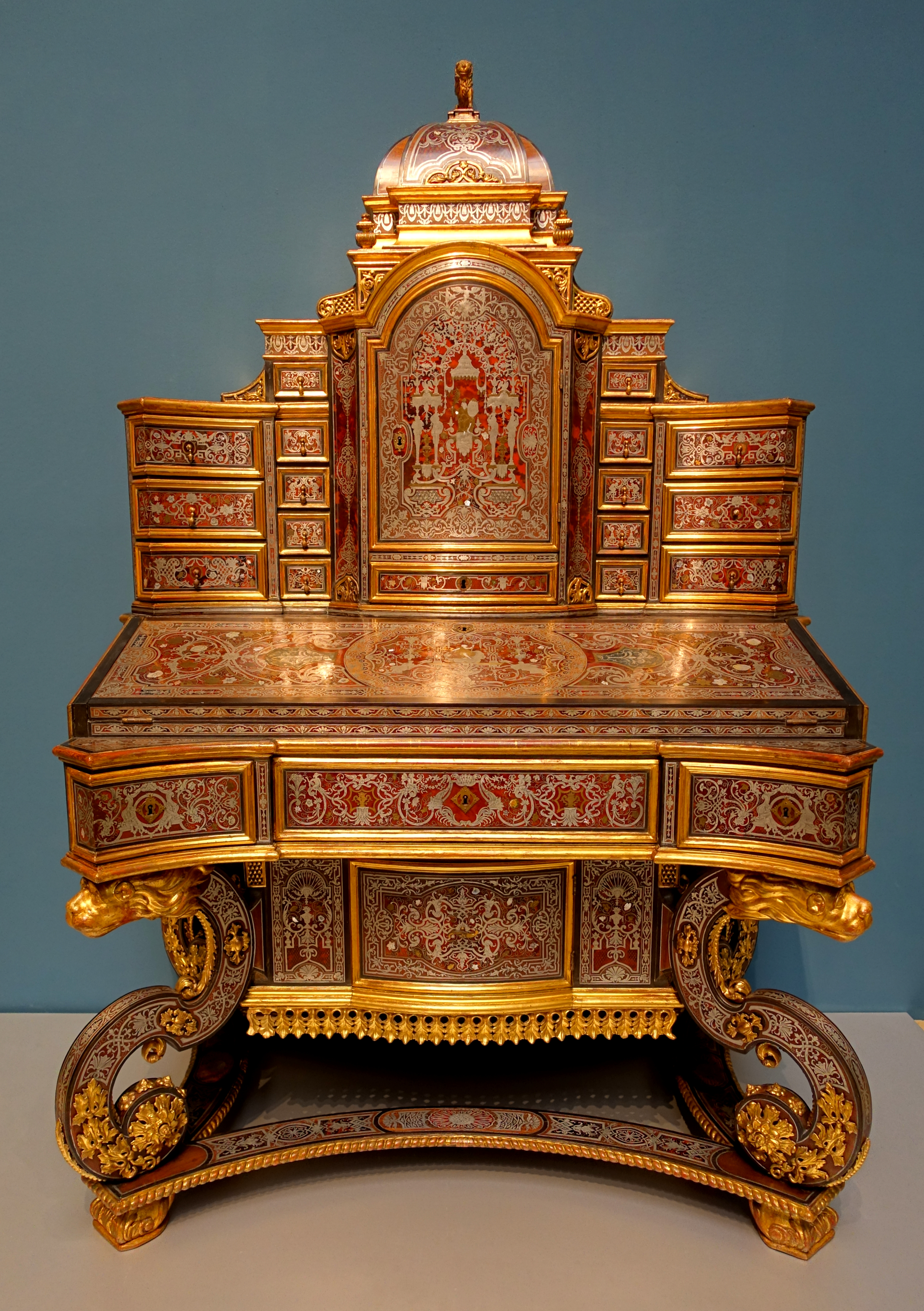
Writing desk by Ferdinand Plitzner, c. 1715-1720

Ferdinand Plitzner (1678—1724) was a German cabinet maker, remembered for his elaborate furniture with Boulle marquetry, and the Spiegelkabinett, a mirrored porcelain room that he created in 1719 at Schloss Weissenstein for Lothar Franz von Schönborn.
