= Norwell =

Norwell may refer to:

- Norwell, Massachusetts, United States
- Norwell, Nottinghamshire, England
- Norwell, Queensland, Australia
- Norwell District Secondary School in Palmerston, Ontario, Canada
