= Andre Staffelbach =

Andre Staffelbach, FIIDA, ASID (born 1939) was born in Chur, Switzerland. Upon completion of his apprenticeship in interior design and studies in the Kunstgewerbeschule in Luzern and Zurich, he received practical experience in Europe with one of Zurich's leading interior design firms before moving to the United States in 1962.

Staffelbach is the founder and creative principal for Staffelbach, an interior design and architecture firm in Dallas, Texas.

Staffelbach was inducted into the International Interior Design Hall of Fame in 1988. In 1987 he received the Distinguished Leadership Award of the International Interior Design Association (IIDA). He is also a member of the American Society of Interior Designers (ASID).

In 2009, Staffelbach celebrated his 70th birthday while cycling the length of the Tour de France.
