= Matthias Lock =

English furniture designer

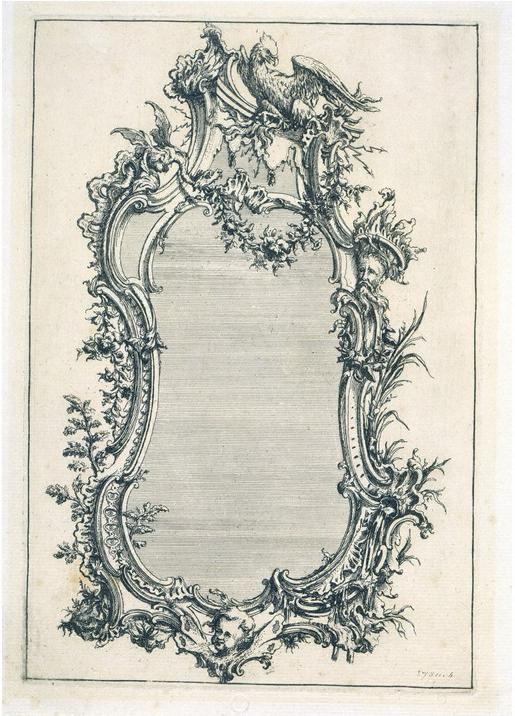
Design, 1744, Matthias Lock V&A Museum no. 27811:6

Matthias Lock (abt. 1710-1765) was an English 18th century furniture designer and cabinet-maker. He was a contemporary of Thomas Chippendale, subsequently a disciple of Adams, and worked in partnership with Henry Copeland.

He was apprenticed to the London joiner Richard Goldsaddle in 1724.

During the greater part of his life he belonged to that flamboyant school which derived its inspiration from Louis XV models; but when he fell under the influence of Robert Adam he absorbed his manner so completely that it is often difficult to distinguish between them, just as it is sometimes easy to confound Locks work with the weaker efforts of Chippendale. Thus from being extravagantly rococo he progressed to a simple ordered classicism. His published designs are not equal to his original drawings, many of which are preserved in the Victoria and Albert Museum, South Kensington, while the pieces themselves are often bolder and more solid than is suggested by the authors representations of them. He was a clever craftsman and holds a distinct place among the minor furniture designers of the second half of the 18th century.

Among his works, some of which were issued in conjunction with Copeland, are: A New Drawing Book of Ornaments; A New Book of Ornaments (1768); A New Book of Pier Frames, Ovals, Girandoles, Tables, etc. (1769); and A New Book of Foliage (1769).
