= Norvell =

Norvell may refer to:

- Congo Norvell, musical group
- Norvell (name)
- Norvell House, Seattle, Washington
- Norvell Township, Michigan
- USCGC Margaret Norvell, ship
