= Frederick William Tod =

Australian woodcarver and furniture maker

- Born: 8 December 1879
- Died: 27 June 1958 (aged 78)
- Occupation: Wood carver, furniture maker

Frederick William Tod (16 December 1879 - 27 June 1958) was an English-born Australian furniture maker and woodcarver. He mainly worked on ecclesiastical carvings.

== Personal life ==
Frederick William Tod was born on 16 December 1879 to Frederick and Sara Tod in Middlesex, England. His father was a woodturner. In his early years, his father apprenticed him at Messrs. Trollopes Studio in London.

He married Alice Maud Ryan in West Hackney in 1902, with whom he had two children: Reginald Frederick(b. 26 August 1904) and Arthur William (b. 5 July 1907).

Tod emigrated to Sydney, Australia in 1915. In the 1920s, he moved to Canterbury, where he daughter Kathleen was born. He eventually moved to Kensington in 1925 and then to Sutherland in 1950, where he died on 27 June 1958.

== Work held in collections ==
- Honour roll designs in the Sydney Living Museums
- Archive of design drawings by F.W. Tod held at Caroline Chisholm
