= Arne Norell =

Swedish furniture designer

Arne Norell (1917–1971) was a Swedish furniture designer and entrepreneur.

Arne Norell started his own workshop in 1954 in the town of Solna, Sweden. Thereafter he moved to Småland and established his own company Möbel AB Arne Norell - today known as 'Norell Furniture' (or 'Norell Möbel AB' in Swedish). He was known for his versatile use of wood, leather, fabric, and metal in furniture characterized by comfort and ease. Arne Norell was a household name within the interior design-world of Europe. Several models were also produced in other parts of the world under a license. He was to a great extent inspired by Danish design. One example of this influence is the safari chair 'Sirocco'. Another of his designs is the lounge chair 'Ari'. It was awarded the British Furniture Manufacturer’s greatest award “showpiece of the year” in 1973. Many of the models he designed came into production after his death in 1971. His designs are still in production today.

A chair designed by Arne Norell of Sweden and made by his firm

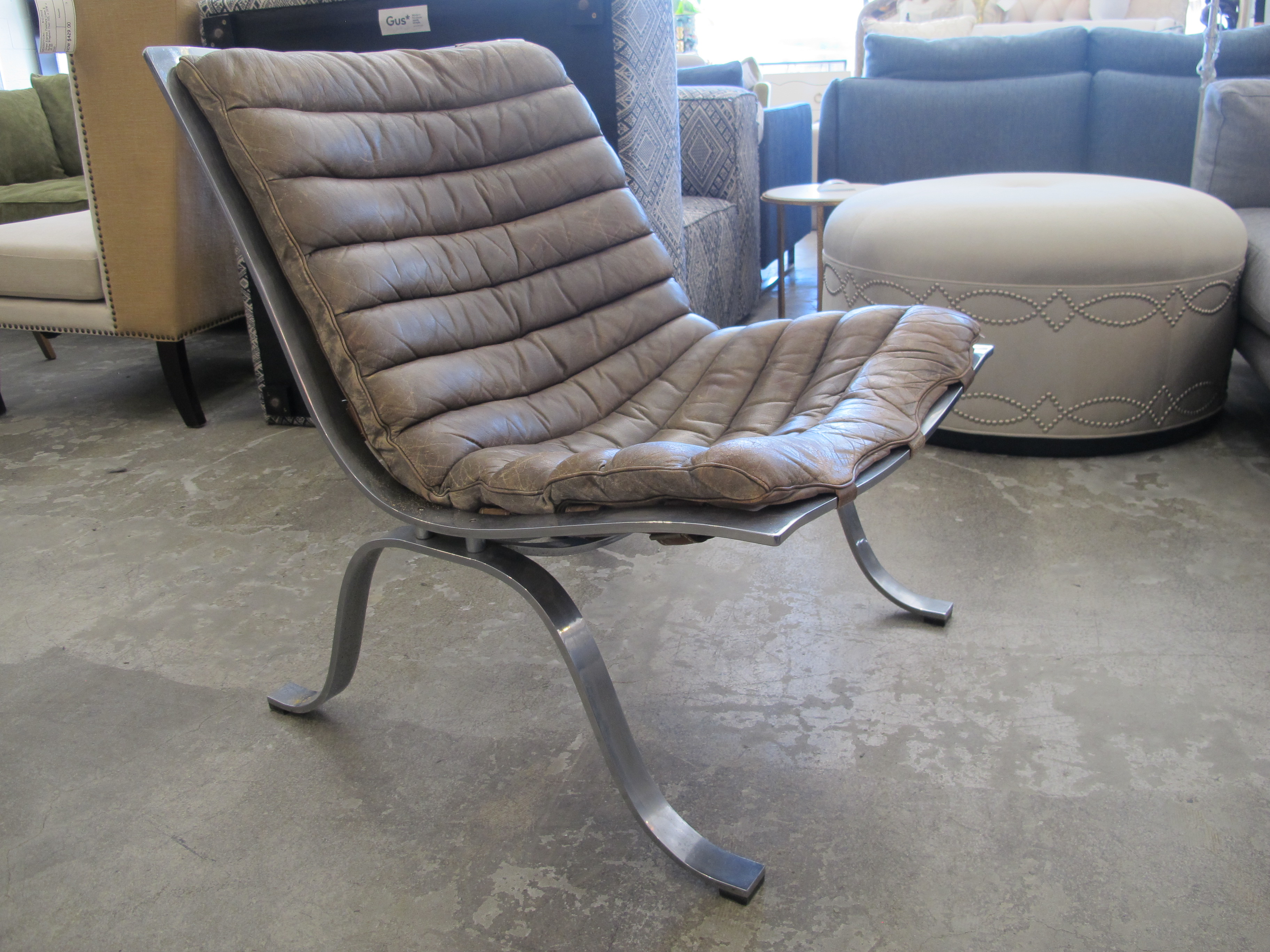

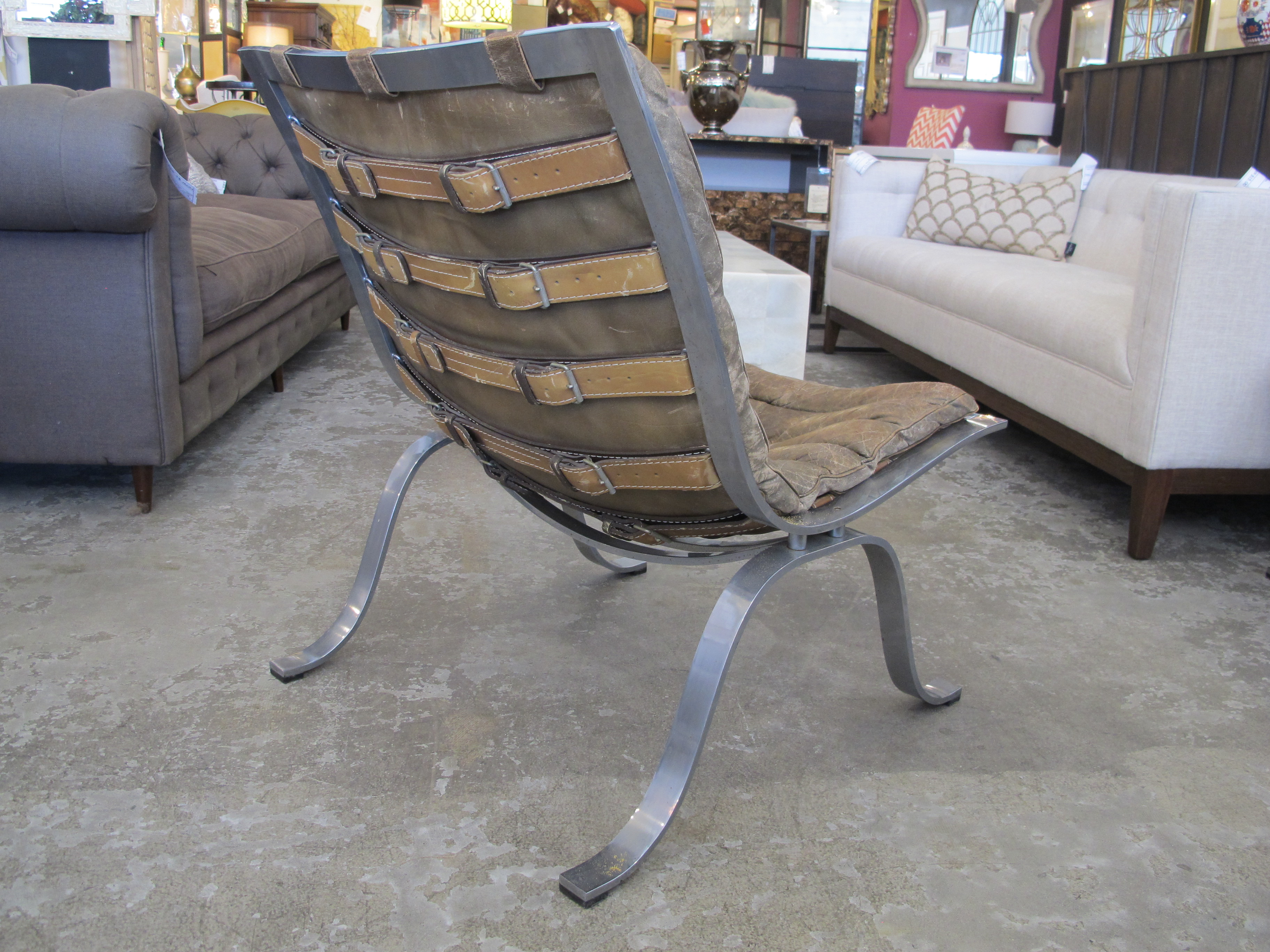
