= Ligma (disambiguation) =

Ligma is an internet meme and joke.

Ligma may also refer to:

- Lesbian and Gay Men's Association (LIGMA), an association in Croatia supporting LGBT rights, 1992–1997
- "Ligma", a song by Magnetic Man
- Rahul Ligma, a fictional ex-employee of Twitter
- Ligma Corporation, the former name of an automobile manufacturing joint venture in Nashville, Illinois, now part of Grupo Antolin

== See also ==
- Ligna, a woodworking trade fair
