= Abernethy biscuit =

Food designed to aid digestion

- Place of origin: United Kingdom
- Created by: John Abernethy
- Main ingredients: Hardtack, sugar, caraway seeds

The Abernethy biscuit is a type of "digestive biscuit", a baked good originally designed to be eaten as a support to proper digestion.

== History ==
The Abernethy biscuit was invented by surgeon John Abernethy in the 18th century as a digestive improver.

Abernethy believed that most diseases were due to disorders in digestion. The Abernethy biscuit was originally designed to be eaten as a support to proper digestion. In creating his biscuit, Abernethy was following a trend of other medical practitioners including English William Oliver of Bath, Somerset, inventor of the Bath Oliver; and the American preacher Sylvester Graham, a nutrition expert after whom the graham cracker is named.

The Abernethy biscuit is an adaptation of the plain captain's biscuit or hardtack, with the added ingredients of sugar (for energy), and caraway seeds because of their reputation for having a carminative (flatulence-preventing) effect making them beneficial in digestive disorders. The biscuit is between an all butter biscuit and a shortcake, rising through the use of ammonium bicarbonate. According to The Oxford Companion to Food, a baker at a shop where Abernethy regularly had lunch created the new biscuit when Abernethy suggested it, naming it after him.

Abernethy biscuits were manufactured by the Aerated Bread Company in the 1870s and 1880s in Adelaide, in the colony of South Australia.

== Today ==
Abernethy biscuits are still popular in Scotland. They are manufactured commercially by Simmers (Edinburgh), The Westray Bakehouse (Orkney Islands), Walls Bakeries (Shetland Islands), and by Stag Bakeries (Isle of Lewis).

== Sample ingredient list ==
The following are ingredients:

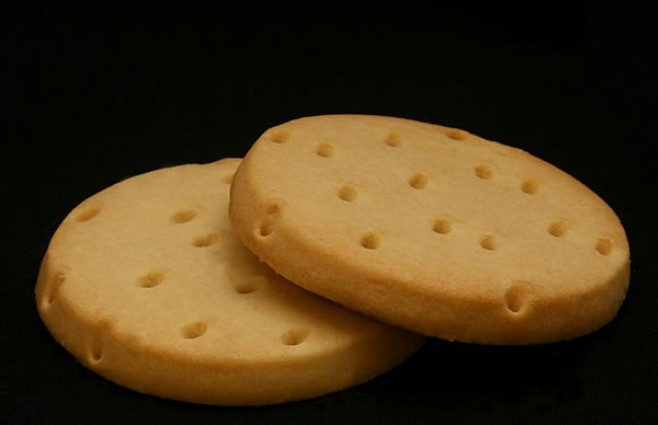
Abernethy biscuits

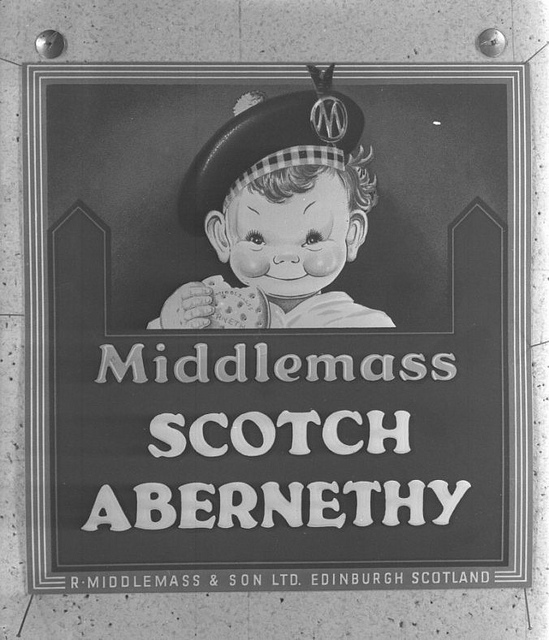
Middlemass, Scottish Abernethy plaque

- Plain flour
- Caster sugar (granulated sugar can also be used)
- Butter
- Baking powder
- Caraway seeds
- Milk
- Egg
- Salt

== Selected references in art and history ==
When British statesman William Gladstone was Vice-President of the Board of Trade in the 1840s, his luncheon consisted of an Abernethy biscuit, brought to him by his wife.

In the libretto of the comic opera Princess Toto written by W. S. Gilbert (first performance 24 June 1876) the king disguises himself as an Abernethy biscuit.

In Charles Dickens's first novel, The Pickwick Papers, the character Mr. Solomon Pell is found, "in court, regaling himself, ... , with a cold collation of an Abernethy biscuit and a saveloy".

== See also ==
- Bath Oliver
- Graham cracker
- Digestive biscuit
