= Woodworking =

Process of making objects from wood

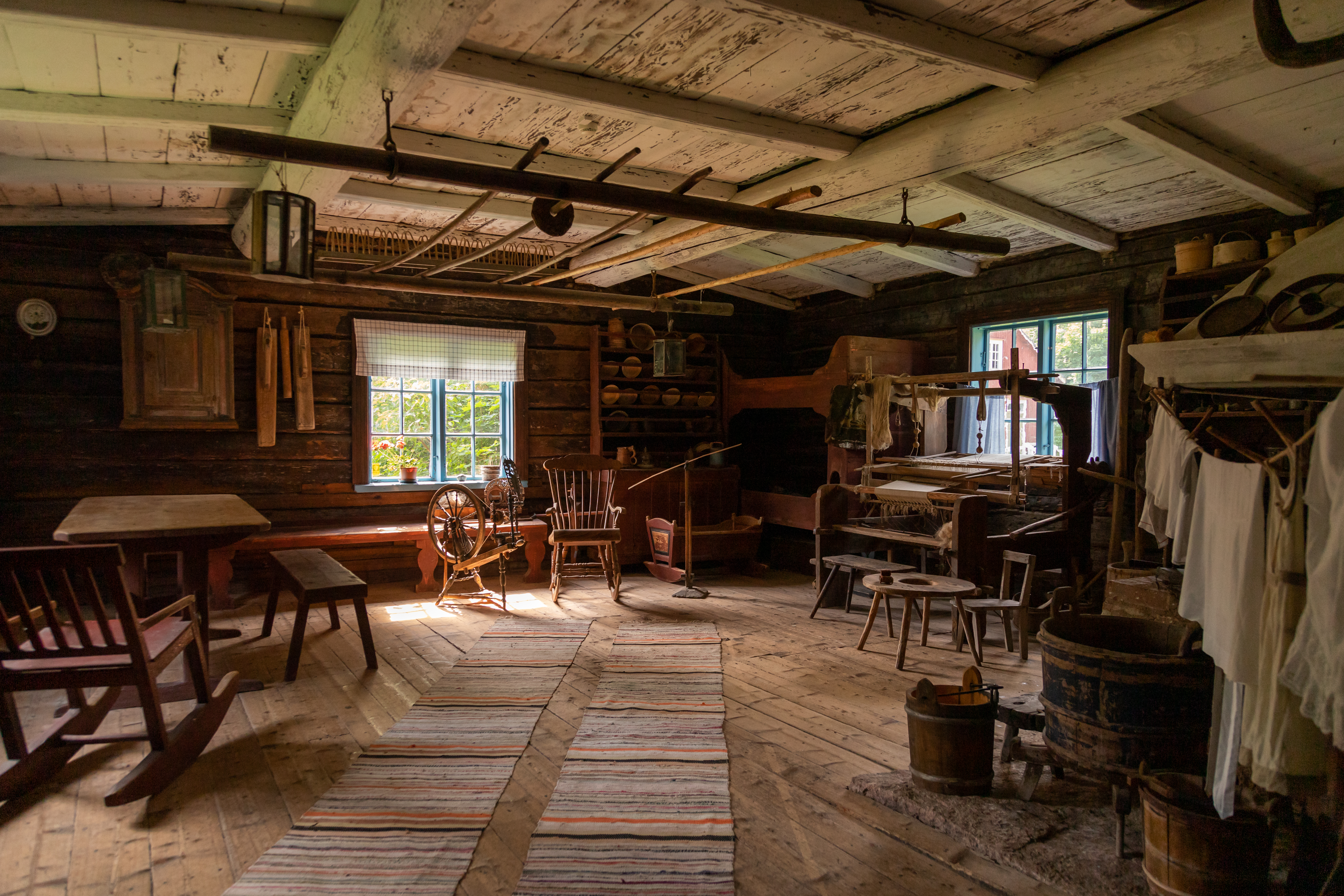
Wooden house with wooden furniture, spinning wheel, loom and various tools

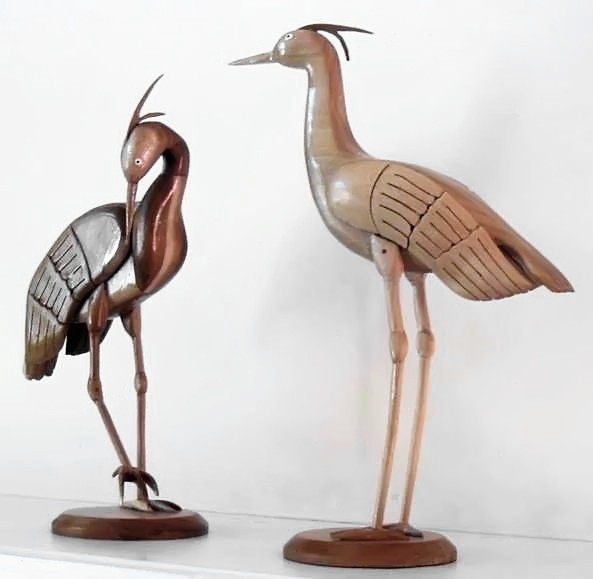
Artists can use woodworking to create delicate sculptures.

Woodworking is the skill of making items from wood, and includes cabinetry, furniture making, wood carving, joinery, carpentry, and woodturning.

== History ==
Along with stone, clay, and animal parts, wood was one of the first materials worked by early humans. Microwear analysis of the Mousterian stone tools used by the Neanderthals show that many were used to work wood. The development of civilization was closely tied to the development of increasingly greater degrees of skill in working these materials.

Among the earliest finds of woodworking are shaped sticks displaying notches from Kalambo Falls in southern Africa, dating to around 476,000 years ago. The Clacton spearhead from Clacton-on-Sea, England, dating to around 400,000 years ago, the Schöningen spears, from Schöningen (Germany) dating around 300,000 years ago and the Lehringen spear from northern Germany, dating to around 120,000 years ago, provide some of the first examples of wooden hunting implements. Wooden tools likely used for domestic activities including probable awls have also been found at Schöningen.

Flint tools were used for carving. Since Neolithic times, carved wooden vessels are known, for example, from the Linear Pottery culture wells at Kückhofen and Eythra.

Examples of Bronze Age woodcarving include tree trunks worked into coffins from northern Germany and Denmark and wooden folding-chairs. The site of Fellbach-Schmieden in Germany has provided fine examples of wooden animal statues from the Iron Age. Wooden idols from the La Tène period known from a sanctuary at the source of the Seine in France.

=== Ancient Egypt ===
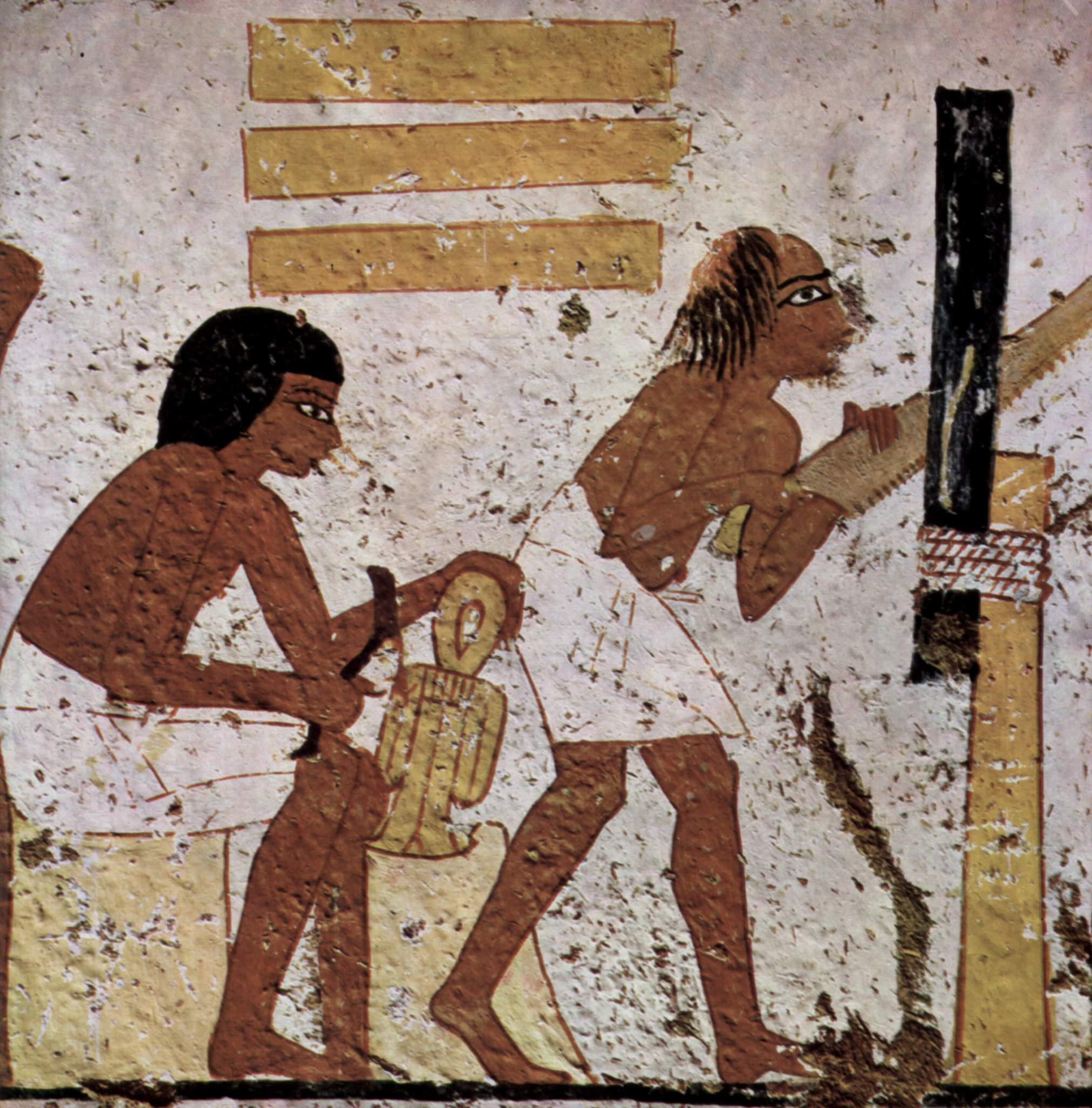
Ancient Egyptian woodworking

There is significant evidence of advanced woodworking in ancient Egypt. Woodworking is depicted in many extant ancient Egyptian drawings, and a considerable amount of ancient Egyptian furniture (such as stools, chairs, tables, beds, chests) have been preserved. Tombs contain a large collection of these artifacts, and the inner coffins found within them were also made of wood. The metal used by the Egyptians for woodworking tools was originally copper and eventually, after 2000 BC, bronze, as iron working was unknown until much later. Each metal used over time for woodworking was harder and more able to hold an edge than the one used prior.

Commonly used woodworking tools included axes, adzes, chisels, pull saws, and bow drills. Mortise and tenon joints are attested from the earliest Predynastic period. These joints were strengthened using pegs, dowels and leather or cord lashings. Animal glue came to be used only in the New Kingdom period. Ancient Egyptians invented the art of veneering and used varnishes for finishing. However, the composition of these varnishes is unknown. Although different native acacias were used, as was the wood from the local sycamore and tamarisk trees, deforestation in the Nile valley resulted in the need for the importation of wood, notably cedar, but also Aleppo pine, boxwood and oak, starting from the Second Dynasty.

=== Ancient Rome ===
Woodworking was essential to the Romans. It provided material for buildings, transportation, tools, and household items. Wood also provided pipes, dyes, waterproofing materials, and heat.Although most examples of Roman woodworking have been lost, the literary record preserved much of the contemporary knowledge. Vitruvius dedicates an entire chapter of his De architectura to timber, preserving many details. Pliny, while not a botanist, dedicated six books of his Natural History to trees and woody plants, providing a wealth of information on trees and their uses.

=== Ancient China ===
The progenitors of Chinese woodworking are considered to be Lu Ban (魯班 pinyin: Lǔbān) and his wife Lady Yun, from the Spring and Autumn period (771 to 476 BC). Lu Ban is said to have introduced the plane, the chalk line, and other tools to China. His teachings were supposedly left behind in the book Lu Ban Jing (魯班經, "Manuscript of Lu Ban")(魯班經 pinyin: Lǔbān jīng). Despite this, it is believed that the text was written some 1500 years after his death. This book is largely filled with descriptions of dimensions for building various items, such as flower pots, tables, altars, etc., and also contains extensive instructions on Feng Shui. It mentions almost nothing of the intricate glue-less and nail-less joinery for which Chinese furniture was so famous.

=== Modern day ===
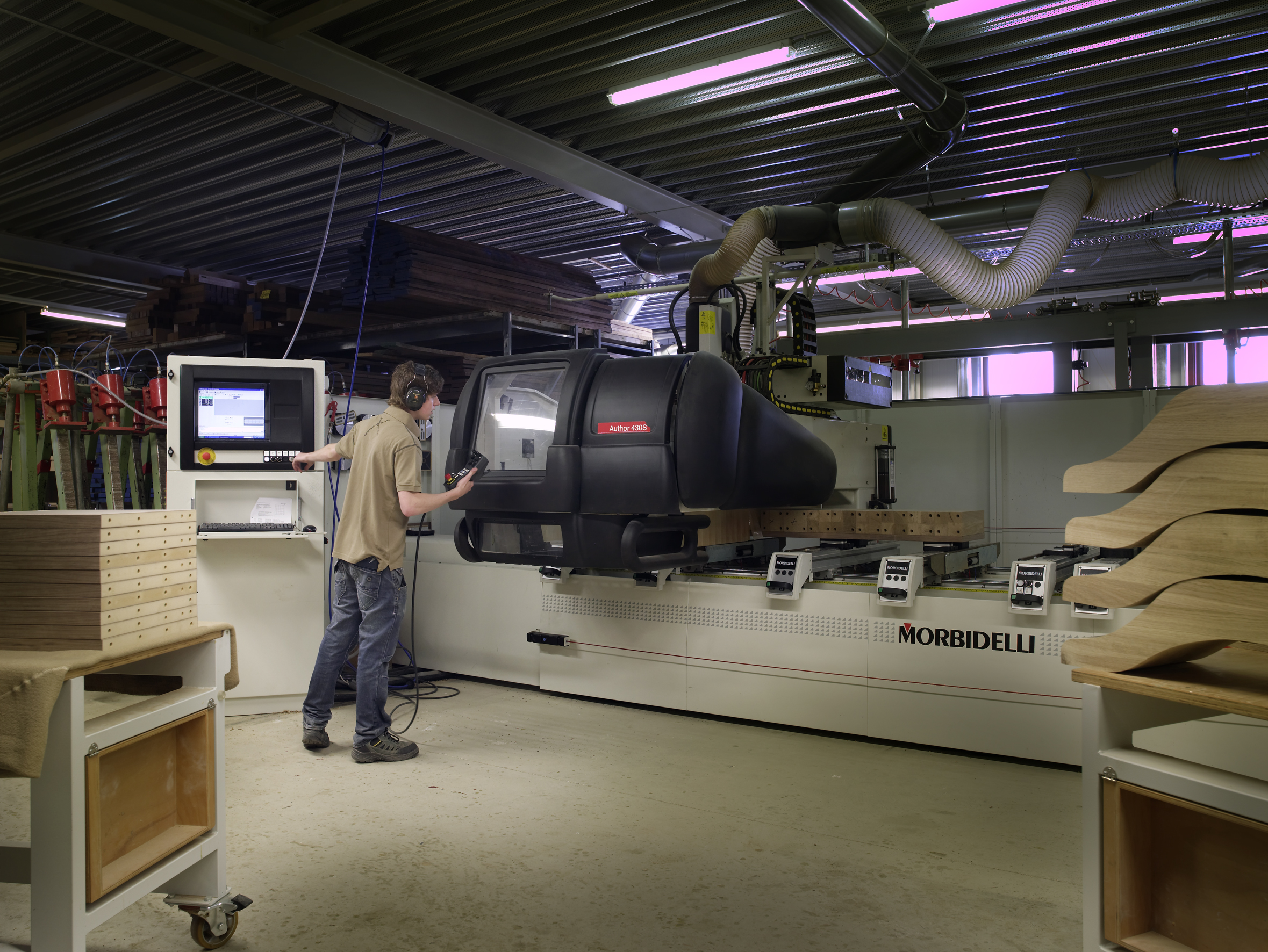
CNC machine that operates on wood

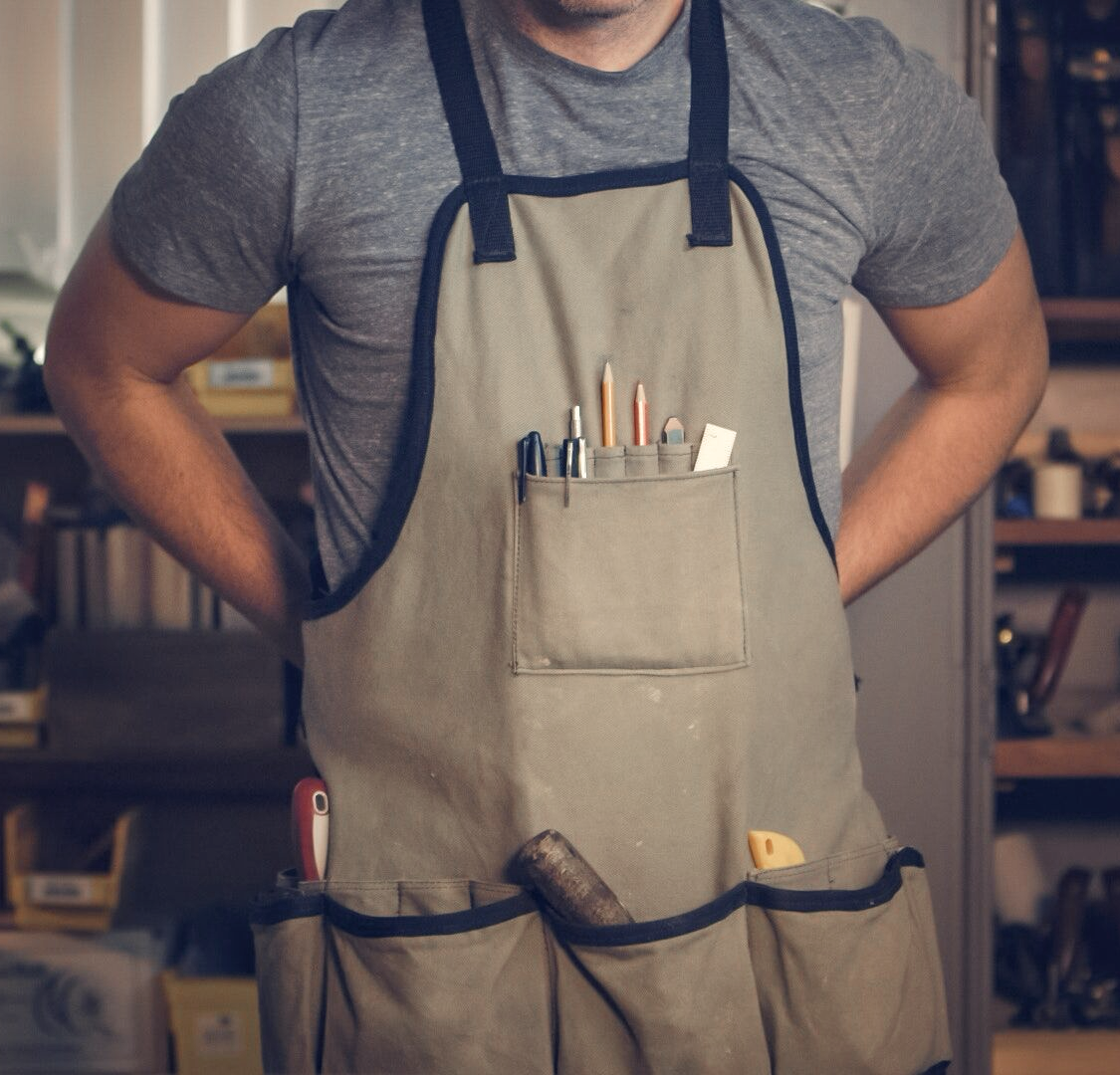
Woodworking apron

With advances in technology and industry demands, the field of woodwork has changed. The development of Computer Numerical Control (CNC) machines, for example, has made it possible to mass-produce and reproduce products faster, with less waste, and often with more complex designs than ever before. CNC wood routers can carve complicated and highly detailed shapes into flat stock to create signs or art. Power tools have increased the efficiency of the manufacture of woodworking projects and require less physical strength than the hand tools used in the past.

Skilled fine woodworking, however, remains a craft pursued by many. There remains demand for handcrafted work such as furniture and art; however, due to production rates and costs, consumer prices are higher.

Modern wood carving usually refers to works of wood art produced by woodcarvers as contemporary art. This type of woodcarving often combines traditional techniques with more modern artistic styles and concepts. Modern woodcarving can be produced in a variety of forms and styles, from realistic to abstract, and often uses unusual woods, such as rain tree or woods with unique textures, to highlight the work's uniqueness.

In recent years, the art of modern woodcarving has become increasingly popular among woodworkers and visual art enthusiasts worldwide. Modern woodcarving art is often exhibited in art galleries and museums, and can be seen in several global contemporary art exhibitions.

== Styles and designs ==
Woodworking, especially furniture making, has many different designs/styles. Throughout its history, woodworking designs and styles have changed. Some of the more common styles are listed below. Traditional furniture styles usually include pieces that have been around for a long time and have long been associated with wealth and luxury. More modern furniture styles have been commonly used over the past few hundred years.

Common woodworking/furniture styles
Traditional & timeless styles	Modern furniture styles
Jacobean	Antique
Dutch	American colonial
Victorian	Traditional
Art Deco	Vintage
Sheraton	Rustic
	Retro
	Modern
	Minimalism
	Contemporary

== Materials ==
See also Wood: Properties and Tonewood: Properties.

Historically, woodworkers relied on the woods native to their region until innovations in transportation and trade made more exotic woods available to the craftsman. Woods are typically sorted into three basic types: hardwoods typified by tight grain and derived from broadleaf trees, softwoods from coniferous trees, and manufactured materials such as plywood and MDF.

Hardwoods, botanically classified as angiosperms, are deciduous and shed their leaves annually in response to temperature changes. Softwoods come from trees botanically known as gymnosperms, which are coniferous, cone-bearing, and stay green year round. Although a general pattern, softwoods are not necessarily always "softer" than hardwoods, and vice versa.

Softwood is most commonly found in regions with lower temperatures and is typically less durable, lighter in weight, and more vulnerable to pests and fungal attacks than hardwoods. They typically have a paler color and a more open grain than hardwoods, which contributes to the tendency of felled softwood to shrink and swell as it dries. Softwoods usually have a lower density, around 432–592 kg/m^{3}, which can compromise its strength. Density, however, does vary within both softwoods and hardwoods depending on the wood's geographical origin and growth rate. However, the lower density of softwoods also allows them to have greater strength relative to their weight. In the United States, softwoods are typically cheaper and more readily available. Most softwoods are suitable for general construction, especially framing, trim, and finish work, and carcassing.

Hardwoods are separated into two categories, temperate and tropical hardwoods, depending on their origin. Temperate hardwoods are found in the regions between the tropics and the poles and are of particular interest to woodworkers for their cost-effective aesthetic appeal and their sustainable sourcing. Tropical hardwoods are found within the equatorial belt, including Africa, Asia, and South America. Hardwoods flaunt a higher density, around 1041 kg/m^{3} as a result of slower growing rates, and are more stable when drying. As a result of their high density, hardwoods are typically heavier than softwoods but can also be more brittle. While there are an abundant number of hardwood species, only 200 are common enough and pliable enough to be used for woodworking. Hardwoods have a wide variety of properties, that afford woodworkers a species to suit nearly any purpose, but they are especially suitable for outdoor use due to their strength and resilience to rot and decay. The coloring of hardwoods ranges from light to very dark, making it especially versatile for aesthetic purposes. However, because hardwoods are more closely grained, they are typically harder to work than softwoods. They are also harder to acquire in the United States and, as a result, are more expensive.

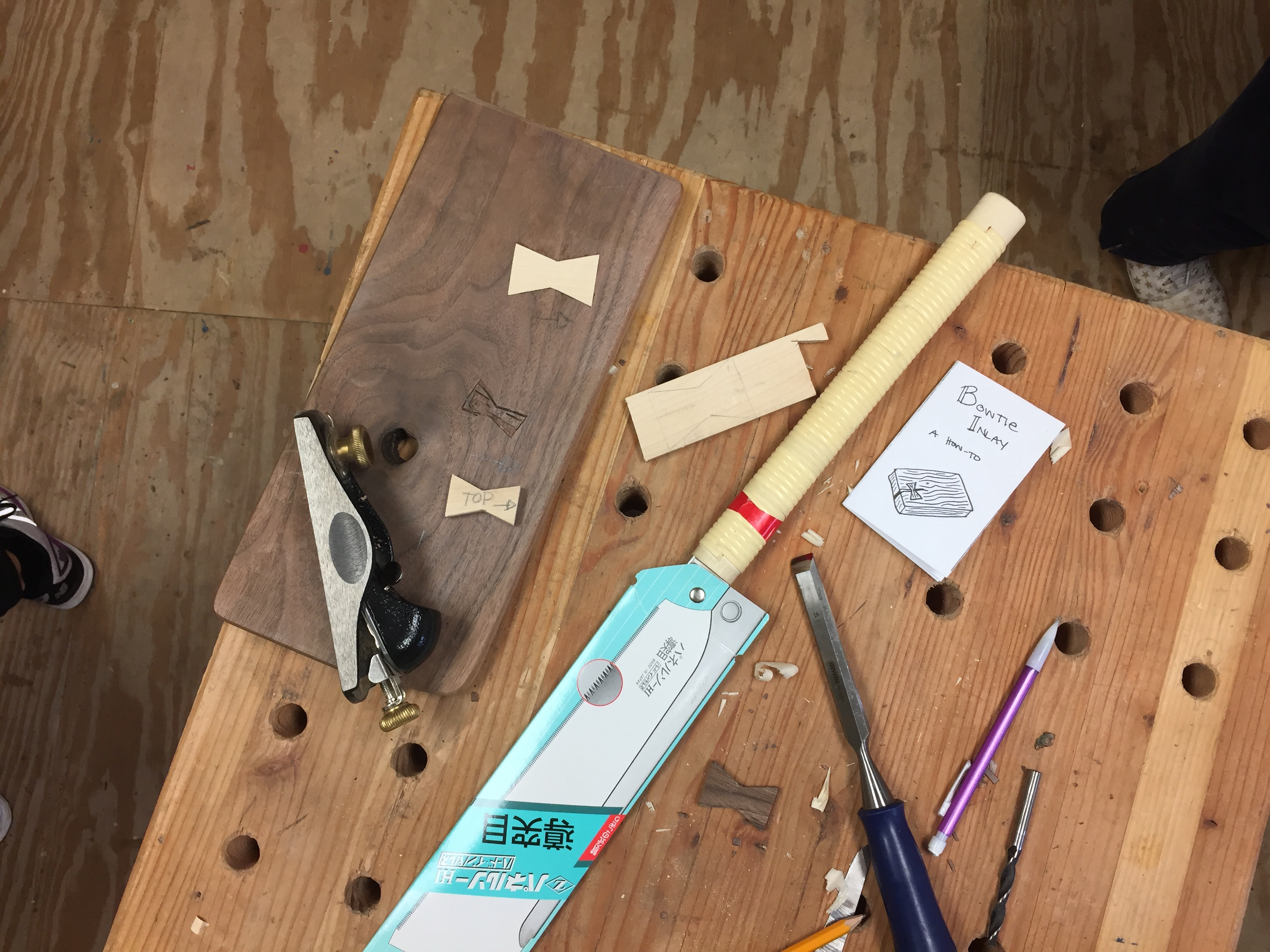
Woodworking hand tools used in class at the Women's Woodshop in Minneapolis, Minnesota, USA

Typically, furniture such as tables and chairs is made from solid hardwood stock due to its strength and resistance to warping. Additionally, they also have a greater variety of grain patterns and color, and take a finish better, which allows the woodworker to exercise a great deal of artistic liberty. Hardwoods can be cut more cleanly and leave less residue on sawblades and other woodworking tools. Cabinet/fixture makers employ the use of plywood and other manufactured panel products that afford greater stability (resistance to changes with temperature and humidity). Some furniture building, such as the Windsor chair, involve green woodworking, shaping with wood while it contains its natural moisture before drying.

=== Common softwoods used for furniture ===
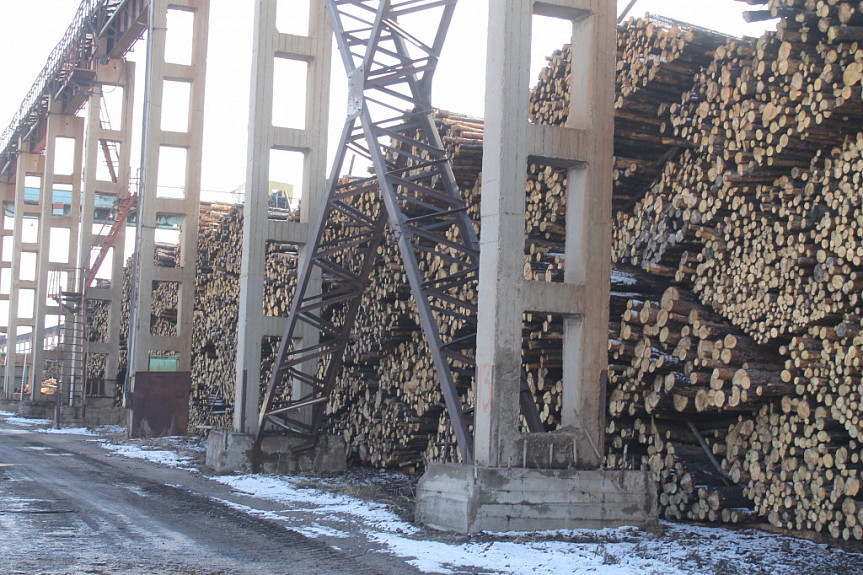
Warehouse of timber at a cardboard factory. Buryatia, Russia

==== Cedar ====
Cedars are strong, aromatic softwoods that are capable of enduring outdoor elements, the most common of which is the western red cedar. Western red cedar can withstand wet conditions without rotting and, as a result, is commonly used for outdoor projects such as patios, outdoor furniture, and building exteriors. This wood can be easily found at most home centers in the US and Canada for a moderate price.

==== Fir ====
In the USA, fir, also known as Douglas fir, is inexpensive and readily available at local home centers. It has a characteristic straight, pronounced grain with a red-brown tint. However, its grain pattern is relatively plain, and it does not stain well, so fir is commonly used for finished products that will be painted. While commonly used for building, this softwood would also be suitable for furniture-making.

==== Pine ====
White pine, ponderosa, and southern yellow pine are common species used in furniture-making. White pine and ponderosa are typically used for indoor projects, while Southern yellow pine is recommended for outdoor projects due to its durability.

=== Common hardwoods used for furniture ===
==== Ash ====
Ash is relatively easy to work with and takes stain well. However, ash can be more difficult to find than other common woods commercially, and may not be found at the local home center. Larger lumber yards should have it in stock. American Ash trees have been destroyed in large numbers by an invasive species of insect known as the Emerald Ash Borer. While unfortunate for the environment, in infestation may make Ash wood more available in some areas of North America.

==== Beech ====
Hardwood of the European species Fagus sylvatica is widely used for furniture framing and carcase construction, in plywood, musical instruments (drum shells and piano blocks), and turned items like knobs.

==== Birch ====
Whether yellow or white birch, these hardwoods are stable and easy to work with. Despite this, birch is prone to blotching when stained, so painting birch products or sealing before staining is probably best. Birch is easily found at many home centers and is a relatively inexpensive hardwood.

==== Cherry ====
Easy to work with, cherry wood is in high demand for its reddish-brown color and ease of staining and finishing. Cherry likely will not be available at the local home center, but can be bought at a lumberyard. This hardwood is a very common material for furniture, and is more resistant to normal wear-and-tear than most softwoods.

==== Mahogany ====
A hardwood, mahogany has a trademark reddish-brown to deep-red tint and is known as "one of the great furniture woods". However, mahogany is not typically grown in sustainably managed forests, and thus commands a steep price at local lumber yards.

==== Oak ====
With two major varieties, red and white, and many sub-types, oak is known to be easy to work with and strong. However, furniture makers often opt for white oak over red oak for its attractive figure and moisture-resistance. Depending on the kind needed, oak can be found at a local home center or a lumberyard.

==== Maple ====
With strength, sturdiness, and durability, maple is a common material for bedroom furniture and even china cabinets. Maple is moisture-resistant and frequently displays chatoyance in the wood grain, an aesthetically pleasing differentiator from other hardwoods. While most commonly a lighter color, maple can also take stains and paint well.

=== Factors in choosing materials ===
There are many factors to consider when deciding what type of wood to use for a project. One of the most important aspects is the workability of the wood: how it responds when worked by hand or with tools, the quality of the grain, and its response to adhesives and finishes. When the workability of wood is high, it offers a lower resistance when cutting and has a diminished blunting effect on tools. Highly workable wood is easier to manipulate into desired forms. If the wood grain is straight and even, it will be easier to create strong glue joints. Additionally, it will help protect the wood from splitting when nailed or screwed. Coarse grains may require a lengthy process of filing and rubbing down the grain to produce a smooth result.

Another important factor is the wood's durability, especially with respect to moisture. If the finished project will be exposed to moisture (e.g., outdoor projects) or to high humidity or condensation (e.g., in kitchens or bathrooms), the wood needs to be especially durable to prevent rot. Because of their oily properties, many tropical hardwoods, such as teak and mahogany, are popular for these applications.

=== Woods used for carving ===
While many woods can be used for carving, there are some clear favorites, including aspen, basswood, butternut, black walnut, and oak. Because it has almost no grain and is notably soft, Basswood is particularly popular with beginner carvers. It is used in many lower-cost instruments, such as guitars and electric basses. Aspen is similarly soft, although slightly harder, and readily available and inexpensive. Butternut has a deeper hue than basswood and aspen and has a nice grain that is easy to carve, and thus friendly for beginners. It is also suitable for furniture. While more expensive than basswood, aspen, and butternut, black walnut is a popular choice for its rich color and grain. Lastly, oak is a strong, sturdy, and versatile wood for carving with a defined grain. It is also a popular wood for furniture making.

== Tools ==
Each area of woodworking requires a different set of tools. Power tools and hand tools are both used for woodworking. Many modern woodworkers choose to use power tools in their trade for added ease and time savings. However, many woodworkers still choose to use only hand tools for reasons such as tradition, experience, and the added character of the work. In contrast, others do so simply for their own enjoyment.

=== Hand tools ===
Hand tools are classified as tools that receive power only from the hands that are holding them. Edged hand woodworking tools need to be sharpened, which is done using the sharpening jig and sharpening stone. A more novel method involves using sandpaper. The more common modern hand tools are:

Hand tools
Clamps	Woodworking clamps. The top left two are f-style clamps. On the right is a quick-grip Irwin clamp. In the bottom middle is a spring clamp.	Clamps are used to hold a workpiece while being worked. Clamps vary in all shapes and sizes, from small C-clamps to very large bar or strap clamps. A vise is a form of clamp, temporarily or permanently mounted as required. A woodworking vise is a vise specialized to the needs of a woodworker; numerous types have evolved.
Chisels	Five woodworking wood chisels	Chisels are tools with a long blade, a cutting edge, and a handle. Used for cutting and shaping wood or other materials.
Claw hammer	A common hammer, the claw hammer, used in woodworking and other activities	The claw hammer, which can hammer, pry, and pull nails, is the most common hammer used in woodworking.
Hand plane	Two woodworking hand planes	A hand plane is used to surface aspects of a workpiece.
Square	A try square. A common style of square in woodworking is usually used for 90-degree angles	The square is used to mark angles on any workpiece. An adjustable square also includes a ruler. A speed square can mark 90 and 45-degree fixed angles and any angle between 0 and 90 degrees using its long axis.
Tape measure	Tape measure	A tape measure is a retractable or flexible ruler that has measurement increments as small as 1/32" or 1 millimeter.
Handsaw	Three old handsaws	A handsaw, according to Cambridge University, "a saw that is operated by hand rather than using electricity or a motor."
Files & Rasps	Top two are files. The bottom (orange-handled) tool is a rasp.	Both files and rasps are used to grind down wood material, either to make the surface flat, rounded, concave, or many other shapes. Rasps make deeper cuts, while files make smaller, less harsh cuts in wood. The difference between the two is mainly their tooth size.

=== Power tools ===
Power tools are tools powered by an external energy source, such as a battery, motor, or a power cable connected to a wall outlet. The more common power tools are:

Power tools
Drill	Cordless electric power drill.	The drill is a tool used to drill a hole or to insert a screw into a workpiece.
Palm sander	Two palm sanders. The left sander is an orbital palm sander. The sander on the right is a mouse sander, which uses vibration instead of orbital motions.	A palm sander is a small powered sander that uses either a vibration or orbital motion to move a piece of sandpaper upon the workpiece, making very fine modifications in smoothing your product.
Compound miter saw	Electric compound miter saw.	A compound miter saw, also known as a chop saw, is a stationary saw used for making precise cuts across the grain path of a board. These cuts can be made at any angle the particular saw is capable of.
Table saw	Electric plug-in tablesaw for woodworking.	A table saw is intended to make long, precise cuts along the grain pattern of the board, known as rip cuts. Most table saws offer the option of a beveled rip cut.
Thickness planer		A thickness planer is used to smooth the surface of a board and make it the exact thickness across the entire board.
Jointer	Powermatic jointer for woodworking.	A jointer is used to produce a flat surface along a board's length and to create a square (or 90°) edge between two adjoining surfaces.
Band saw	Plug-in band saw.	A band saw is used to make both irregularly shaped cuts and cuts through material thicker than a table saw can manage. It is much more robust than the jigsaw or more delicate scroll saw, also regularly used in woodworking.
Drill press	Older drill press. Floor-mounted drill press.	A drill press is an important tool used in woodworking. It is similar to a hand drill but is a table- or floor-mounted machine that uses a shaft with a spring-loaded handle to lower the drill bit into the wood or other material. Many woodworkers use a hand drill, but a drill press is even more accurate and powerful.
Drum sander		A drum sander is a machine that uses a wide rotating sandpaper drum to sand down a piece of wood as it rolls through the tool. Similar to a planer in how it operates, but instead of blades, a drum sander uses sandpaper.

== Notable woodworkers ==
- Alvar Aalto
- Norm Abram
- Bae Se-hwa
- John Boson
- Jimmy Carter
- Jesus
- George Collings
- Frank E. Cummings III
- Henning Engelsen
- Wharton Esherick
- Tage Frid
- Alexander Grabovetskiy
- Greta Hopkinson
- James Krenov
- Mark Lindquist
- Sal Maccarone
- Thomas J. MacDonald
- John Makepeace
- Sam Maloof
- David J. Marks
- Judy Kensley McKie
- George Nakashima
- Jere Osgood
- Alan Peters
- Matthias Pliessnig
- André Jacob Roubo
- Evert Sodergren
- Rosanne Somerson
- Henry O. Studley
- Roy Underhill
- Wendy Maruyama
- Charles H. Hayward
- Nick Offerman

== See also ==
- Boat building
- Cabinet making
- Carpentry
- Ébéniste
- Fire hardening
- Glossary of woodworking terms
- Green building and wood
- Green woodworking
- History of construction
- History of wood carving
- Intarsia
- Japanese carpentry
- Lath art
- Ligna
- Luthier
- Millwork
- Marionette
- Marquetry
- Pallet crafts
- Reclaimed lumber
- Saw pit
- Segmented turning
- Sloyd, a system of handicraft-based education
- Stave church
- Studio furniture
- Tack cloth
- Timber framing
- Turning
- Wood carving
- Wood glue
- Wood Inlay
- Woodshop
- Woodturning
- Woodworking safety
- Woodworking workbench
- Yakisugi
