= Deez Nuts (satirist) =

Satirical candidate in 2016 U.S. presidential election

- Campaign: 2016 U.S. presidential election
- Candidate: Deez Nuts
- Affiliation: Independent
- Headquarters: Wallingford, Iowa
- Key people: Brady C. Olson

Deez Nuts was a satirical presidential candidate portrayed by Brady C. Olson who ran for president of the United States in 2016.

On July 26, 2015, Olson—then 15 years of age, and a resident of Wallingford, Iowa—filed a statement of Deez Nuts's presidential candidacy with the Federal Election Commission. In polls conducted by Public Policy Polling in Iowa, Minnesota, and North Carolina in mid-August 2015, Deez Nuts polled at eight, eight, and nine percent, respectively, garnering media attention.

On August 19, 2015, The Daily Beast revealed that Deez Nuts was actually Olson. In an interview with Rolling Stone, Olson said that he jokingly created the Deez Nuts candidacy "half-trying to break the two-party system" and half out of frustration with the leading candidates, choosing the pseudonym based on the bofa meme. Olson endorsed Vermont Senator Bernie Sanders for the Democratic nomination and Ohio Governor John Kasich for the Republican nomination. Olson has expressed libertarian views. According to Section 1 of Article Two of the United States Constitution, Olson did not meet the minimum age requirement (35 years) to serve as president if elected.

Nuts' bid for the presidency drew attention to other questionable candidates who had filed to run for office. Analyst Jim Williams of Public Policy Polling opined that because of a fringe element of the population with a penchant for anti-establishment candidates, "you could call [the third party candidate] anything, and they would get their 7% or 8%".

A poll taken in Texas in mid-August 2016 showed Nuts receiving 3% support for the presidency; this figure exceeded the amount of support received by Green Party presidential candidate Jill Stein and the deceased gorilla Harambe, another Internet phenomenon. On October 11, 2015, Deez Nuts announced on Facebook that he intended to run for Speaker of the United States House of Representatives. Nuts cited the scarcity of candidates for the position as well as his alleged eligibility for it.

== Campaign policy positions ==
The New York Times reported that Nuts supported the Iran nuclear deal and a balanced budget. The Gazette said his campaign website indicated support for deporting undocumented adults, cutting subsidies for oil companies, and offering corporate tax incentives to create US-based jobs.

== Endorsements and reactions ==
Deez Nuts was endorsed by hip-hop artist Warren G, who had created the original skit "Deeez Nuuuts" as part of a song on Dr. Dre's album The Chronic. Rapper Ice-T also endorsed Deez Nuts.

Music producer Diplo said "If I got to decide between Donald Trump and Hillary Clinton ... I'm definitely voting for Deez Nuts." Television host Conan O'Brian stopped short of an endorsement, saying, "Before we completely write him off as a joke, why don't we at least find out more about the foreign policy experience of Deez Nuts?"

== Polling ==
=== Nationwide ===
Poll source	Date	Democratic candidate	%	Republican candidate	%	Independent candidate	%
Public Policy Polling Sample size: 1,083; Margin of error ±3.0%	March 24–26, 2016	Hillary Clinton	42%	Donald Trump	37%	Deez Nuts	10%
Public Policy Polling Sample size: 1,083; Margin of error ±3.0%	March 24–26, 2016	Bernie Sanders	43%	Donald Trump	37%	Deez Nuts	8%

=== Statewide ===
==== North Carolina ====
Poll source	Date	Democratic candidate	%	Republican candidate	%	Independent candidate	%	Other	%
Public Policy Polling Sample size: 406; Margin of error ±3.2%	August 12–16, 2015	Hillary Clinton	38%	Donald Trump	40%	Deez Nuts	9%	Not sure	12%

Poll source	Date
Public Policy Polling Q33: joke candidates Sample size: 1,254; Margin of error ±2.8%	August 28–30, 2016

Candidate	%	Candidate	%	Candidate	%	Candidate	%	Candidate	%	Candidate	%	Candidate	%	Candidate	%	Other	%
Beast Mode	5%	Butt Stuff	3%	Captain Crunch	17%	Cranky Pants	2%	Deez Nuts	9%	Limberbutt McCubins	1%	'Murican Cookies	1%	Queen Elsa Ice	4%	Not sure	58%

==== Texas ====
Poll source	Date	Democratic candidate	%	Republican candidate	%	Independent candidate	%	Independent candidate	%	Other	%
Public Policy Polling Sample size: 944; Margin of error ±3.2%	August 12–14, 2016	Hillary Clinton	38%	Donald Trump	47%	Deez Nuts	3%	Harambe	2%	Undecided	11%

==== Utah ====
Poll source	Date	Candidate	%	Candidate	%	Candidate	%	Candidate	%	Candidate	%	Candidate	%	Other	%
Public Policy Polling Q18: minor candidates Sample size: 1,018; Margin of error ±3.1%	August 19–21, 2016	Darrell Castle	3%	Deez Nuts	4%	Harambe	3%	Gary Johnson	18%	Evan McMullin	11%	Jill Stein	5%	Not sure	54%

== Aftermath ==
In August 2016, the Federal Election Commission announced its intent to punish future satirical candidates for president for filing false documents with a federal agency.

Olson later enrolled at the University of Iowa to study finance. In 2019, he told The Gazette, "I don't foresee ever running again".
