= John Boson =

English cabinet maker and carver

John Boson was a cabinet maker and carver whose work is associated with that of William Kent. It is said that if he had not died at such a relatively young age then his place would have been assured in the history of furniture making in the United Kingdom.

He was born around the year 1705 and it is most likely that he learned his trade and served his apprenticeship near the naval shipyards of Deptford, for by the 1720s he had a yard and workshop in Greenwich. His name first appeared as that of a carver when he worked on St. George's Church, Bloomsbury in London. In 1725 his first domestic work is recorded when he made carvings for 4 St James's Square, London. He was at the same time one of the craftsmen employed to work on the Fifty New Churches designed by Sir Christopher Wren. He did not neglect the secular and domestic market and he is recorded as a worker at East India House, Leadenhall Street in 1730; this time with a partner named John How. He is well known for his carved chimney-pieces and there are good examples in the 'Great Room' at Baylies, Stoke Poges, Buckinghamshire and another example at Sir Michael Newton's seat of Culverthorpe, Lincolnshire. The 1730s were the years of Boson's greatest success and it was during this time that he regularly carried out work for Frederick, Prince of Wales at his houses at Leicester Fields, Kew Palace, and Cliveden, Buckinghamshire.

Boson is also believed to have carved the Corinthian capitals on the portico at Chiswick House, together with the capitals in the Link Building.

There are very few pieces that are recorded as being the work of John Boson and only seven pieces remain complete with their receipts. One of these is a large carved and gilt mirror that is in the collection of the Victoria and Albert Museum, London. At Chiswick House Boson carved two magnificent tables for Lady Burlington and their two accompanying mirror frames. All pieces included carved owls, part of the heraldic badge for Dorothy Savile.
