= 1 Broad Street, Bath =

1 Broad Street
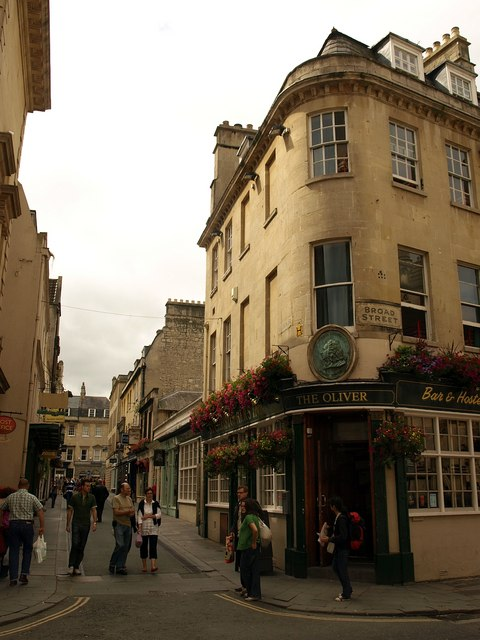
- The building in 2008

- Location within England Location within Somerset
- 51.38355°N 2.36008°W
- Location: 1 Broad Street, Bath, England

History
- Built: late 18th century

Listed Building – Grade II
- Official name: The Oliver Public House
- Designated: 11 August 1972
- Reference no.: 1394959

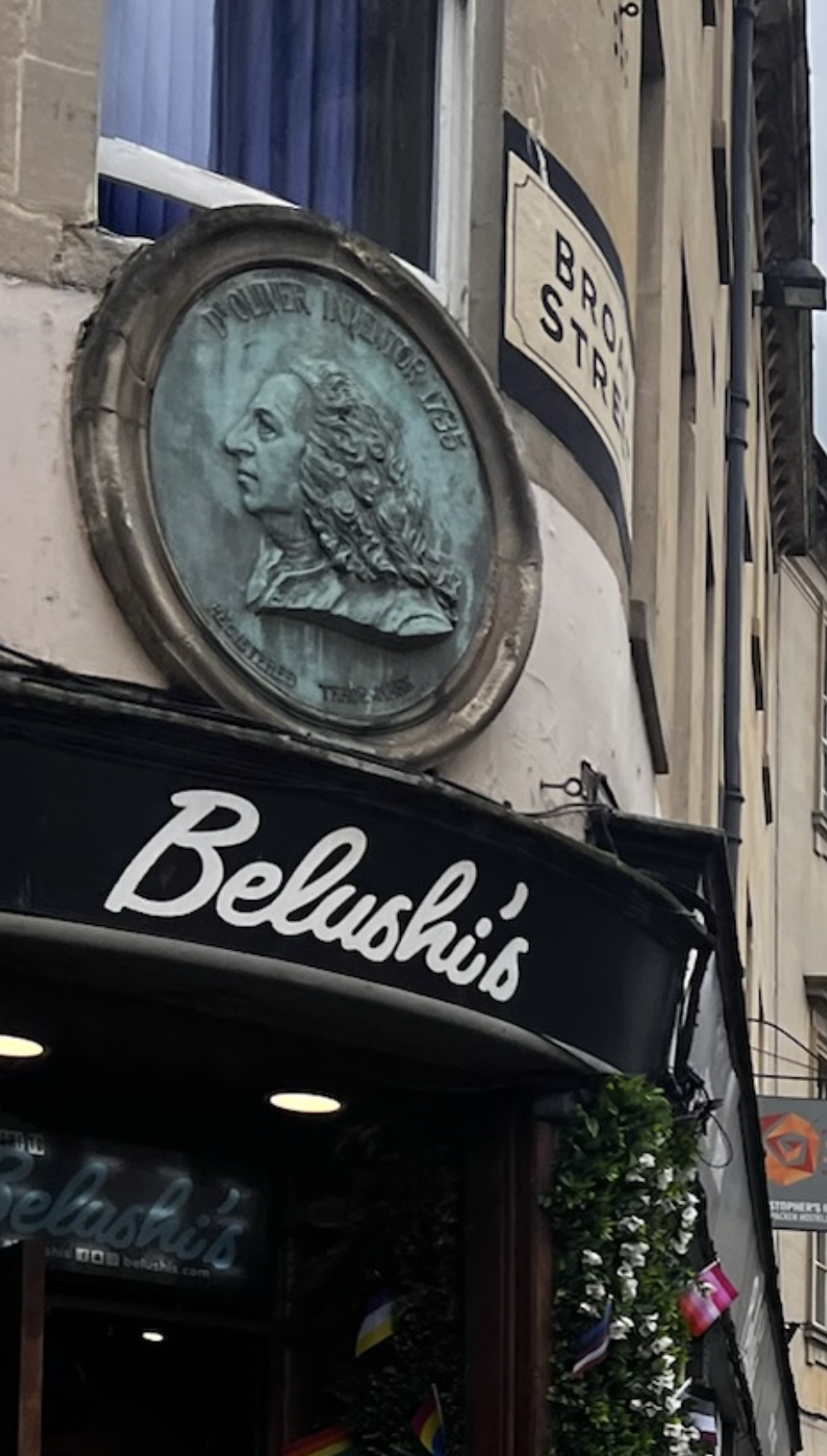
Plaque commemorating Dr William Oliver

1 Broad Street is a historic building in Bath, Somerset, England. Standing at 1 Broad Street, at Broad Street's junction with Green Street, the building was completed in the late 18th century. It is now Grade II listed. It is constructed of limestone ashlar with a roof covered in Welsh slate.

The building was formerly two houses (with 9 Green Street), but was converted to a public house with accommodation on the first and second floors.

Between 1962 and 2003, the building was The Oliver Inn, named for 18th-century Bath physician Dr William Oliver. A plaque above the door commemorates Oliver. After a major renovation, it reopened as St Christopher's Inn. It became today's restaurant, Belushi's, a few years later.
