= William Oliver (physician, 1695–1764) =

English physician and inventor (1696–1764)

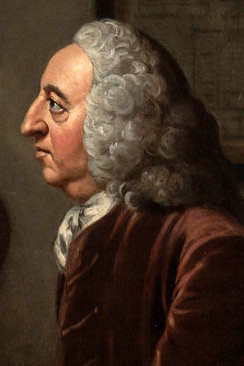
- Born: 14 August [O.S. 4 August] 1695; Ludgvan, Cornwall, England
- Died: 17 March 1764 (aged 68); Bath, Somerset, England
- Education: Pembroke College, Cambridge, Leiden University
- Medical career
- Profession: Medicine
- Institutions: Royal Mineral Water Hospital, Royal Society

William Oliver (14 August [O.S. 4 August] 1695 – 17 March 1764) was a British physician and philanthropist, and inventor of the Bath Oliver. He was born at Ludgvan, Cornwall, and baptised on 27 August 1695, described as the son of John Oliver the owner of the Trevarno Estate. His family, originally seated at Trevarnoe in Sithney, resided afterwards in Ludgvan, and the estate of Treneere in Madron, which belonged to him, was sold in 1768 after his death. When he decided to erect a monument in Sithney churchyard to the memory of his parents, Alexander Pope wrote the epitaph and drew the design of the pillar. He was admitted a pensioner of Pembroke College, Cambridge on 17 September 1714, graduated M.B. in 1720, and M.D. in 1725, and to complete his medical training, entered at Leiden University on 15 November 1720. On 8 July 1756 he was incorporated at Oxford, and he was elected a Fellow of the Royal Society on 22 January 1729–30.

== Medical career ==
Oliver practised for a time at Plymouth, on returning from Leyden, where he introduced inoculation for smallpox. but about 1725 he settled at Bath and remained there for the rest of his life, obtaining in a very short time the leading practice of the city. This was mainly due to his friendship with Ralph Allen (a fellow Cornishman, who introduced him to Pope, Warburton, and the rest of the guests at Prior Park), and with Dr. William Borlase, his 'friend and relation,’ who, after being his patient in 1730, sent to him the gentry of the west country.

=== Hospital ===
Oliver took great pains in obtaining subscriptions for the erection of the Water or General Hospital, now called the Royal Mineral Water Hospital, at Bath, and, in 1737, he made an offer of some land for its site, which was at first accepted, but afterwards declined. Next year he was appointed one of the treasurers to the fund, and in July 1739 he became a deputy-president. On 1 May 1740 he was appointed physician to the hospital, and on the same day Jeremiah (known as Jerry) Peirce became the surgeon. The regulations for the admission and removal of English patients were drawn up by him; and in 1756, when the privileges were extended to patients from Scotland and Ireland, he compiled a set of rules applicable to their case. Oliver ruled the institution until 1 May 1761, when he and Peirce both resigned. The third article in Charleton's Three Tracts on Bath Waters, 1774, consisted of 'histories of hospital cases under the care of the late Dr. Oliver,’ a subject on which he had himself contemplated the publication of a volume; and Some Observations on Stomach Complaints, which were found among his papers, were printed in pp. 76–95 of the same work. Peirce and Oliver were painted together by William Hoare, R.A. in 1742, in a picture now in the board-room of the hospital, in the act of examining three patients, candidates for admission.

=== Controversy ===
Oliver's position in the medical world of Bath involved him in trouble. Archibald Cleland, one of the hospital surgeons, was dismissed in 1743 on a charge of improper conduct, and the dismissal led to many pamphlets. An inquiry was held into the circumstances, under the presidency of Philip, brother of Ralph, Allen; this resulted in Oliver's conduct being highly commended. In 1757, Oliver and some other physicians in the city declined to attend any consultations with William Baylies, M.D. and Charles Lucas, M.D., in consequence of their reflections on the use and abuse of the waters, and their censures on the conduct of the physicians at the hospital. Much correspondence ensued, and it was published as proving the existence of a 'physical confederacy in Bath.' His medical skill is mentioned by Mrs. Anne Pitt. and by Mrs. Delany He and Peirce attended Ralph Allen in his last illness, and each received a complimentary legacy of £100.

== The Bath Oliver and Bath Bun ==
Oliver is said to have invented the Bath bun, however it proved too fattening for his rheumatic patients, and so he invented the ‘Bath Oliver’ biscuit, and shortly before his death confided the recipe to his coachman Atkins, giving him at the same time £100 in money and ten sacks of the finest wheat-flour. The fortunate recipient opened a shop in Green Street, and soon acquired a large fortune. The 'Bath Oliver' is still a well-known brand.

== Personal life ==
In 1746, Oliver purchased a small farmhouse two miles from Box, near Bath, as a vacation residence, and called it Trevarnoe, after the scene of his childhood and the abode of his fathers. For many years before his death he was subject to the gout. He died at Bath on 17 March 1764, and was buried in All Saints' Church of Weston, near that city, where an inscription 'on a white tablet, supported by palm-branches,’ was erected to his memory. There is also a plain mural tablet to his memory in Bath Abbey.

The statement in the Life and Times of Selina, countess of Huntingdon (i. 450–1), that he remained 'a most inveterate infidel till a short time before his death' is probably an exaggeration. He was generally admitted to have been an eminently sensible man, and one also of a most compassionate and benevolent nature. His library was sold in 1764. His son, the third William Oliver, matriculated from Christ Church, Oxford, on 20 January 1748–9, aged 18, and his name appears on the books at Leyden on 21 September 1753. The eldest daughter married a son of the Rev. John Acland, rector of Broadclyst, Devonshire; the second daughter, Charlotte, married, 14 April 1752, Sir John Pringle, bart., F.R.S. Some of his descendants are said to have been living at Bath in 1852.

== Writings ==
Oliver published, in 1753, Myra: a pastoral dialogue sacred to the memory of a lady who died 29 Dec. 1753, aged 25. His Practical Essay on the Use and Abuse of warm Bathing in Gouty Cases came out in 1751, passed into a second edition in 1751, and into a third in 1764.

Philip Thicknesse inserted some remarks on this essay in his Valetudinarian's Bath Guide, (1780, pp. 30–36). Oliver was also the anonymous author of A Faint Sketch of the Life, Character, and Manners of the late Mr. Nash, which was printed at Bath for John Keene, and sold at 3d. It was praised by Oliver Goldsmith as 'written with much good sense and still more good nature,’ and it was embodied in Goldsmith's Life of Beau Nash. It also appeared in the Public Ledger of 12 March 1761, and in the Rev. Richard Warner's History of Bath, (pp. 370–1). To the Philosophical Transactions for 1723 and 1755 respectively he contributed brief papers on medical topics, the former being addressed to Dr. Richard Mead.

Oliver wrote some elegiac lines on the death of Ralph Thicknesse; he was standing at Thicknesse's elbow at the moment that Thicknesse fell dead as he was playing the first fiddle in a performance of a piece of his own composition at a concert in Bath. His lines to Sir John Cope 'upon his catching Sir Anthony's fire by drinking Bath waters,’ are in Mrs. Stopford Sackville's manuscripts.

Oliver applied to Dr. Borlase for minerals for Pope's grotto, and his name frequently occurs in the letters of Pope and Borlase at Castle Horneck, near Penzance. A letter to Oliver from Pope, dated 8 October 1740, and the property of Henry George Bohn, was inserted with the first draft of the reply in Carruthers's Life of Pope. Several other letters were formerly in the possession of Upcott. One, dated 28 August 1743, is printed in Roscoe's Works of Pope, (i. 541–2), and it was reprinted with two others which were taken from the European Magazine.

In the summer of 1743 Oliver wrote to Pope to free himself from all knowledge of John Tillard's attack on William Warburton, which was dedicated to him without his knowledge (Works, ed. Courthope, ix. 233). Two letters from Warburton to Oliver are in Nichols's Literary Anecdotes, (v. 581–582), and several communications from him to Doddridge from 1743 to 1749 are contained in the latter's Correspondence, (v. 223–225, 302–4, v. 66–7, 126–9).

Three letters from Stephen Duck to him are printed in the European Magazine, (1795, pt. i. p. 80 and pt. ii. p. 79). He bestowed many favours on Duck, and was, no doubt, the polite son of Æsculapius depicted in that author's Journey to Marlborough, Bath, &c. (Works, 1753, p. 75).

A letter from Oliver to Dr. Ward on two Roman altars discovered at Bath is in the British Museum, (Addit. MS. 6181, f. 63), and three more letters referring to some dirty and miserly old acquaintance of Jacob Tonson at Bath in 1735, are in Addit. MS. 28275, fols. 356–61.

Some manuscript letters to James Jurin belong to the Royal Society.

Benjamin Heath dedicated to him in 1740 The Essay towards a demonstrative Proof of the Divine Existence; plate 18 in the Antiquities of Cornwall was engraved at his expense and inscribed to him by Dr. Borlase; and the later impressions of Mary Chandler's 'Description of Bath' contained (pp. 21–3) some verses to him acknowledging that he had corrected her poem, and that 'ev'n Pope approv'd when you had tun'd my Lyre.'

== See also ==
- 1 Broad Street, Bath – formerly named The Oliver Inn
