= John Abernethy (surgeon) =

English surgeon (1764–1831)

John Abernethy FRS
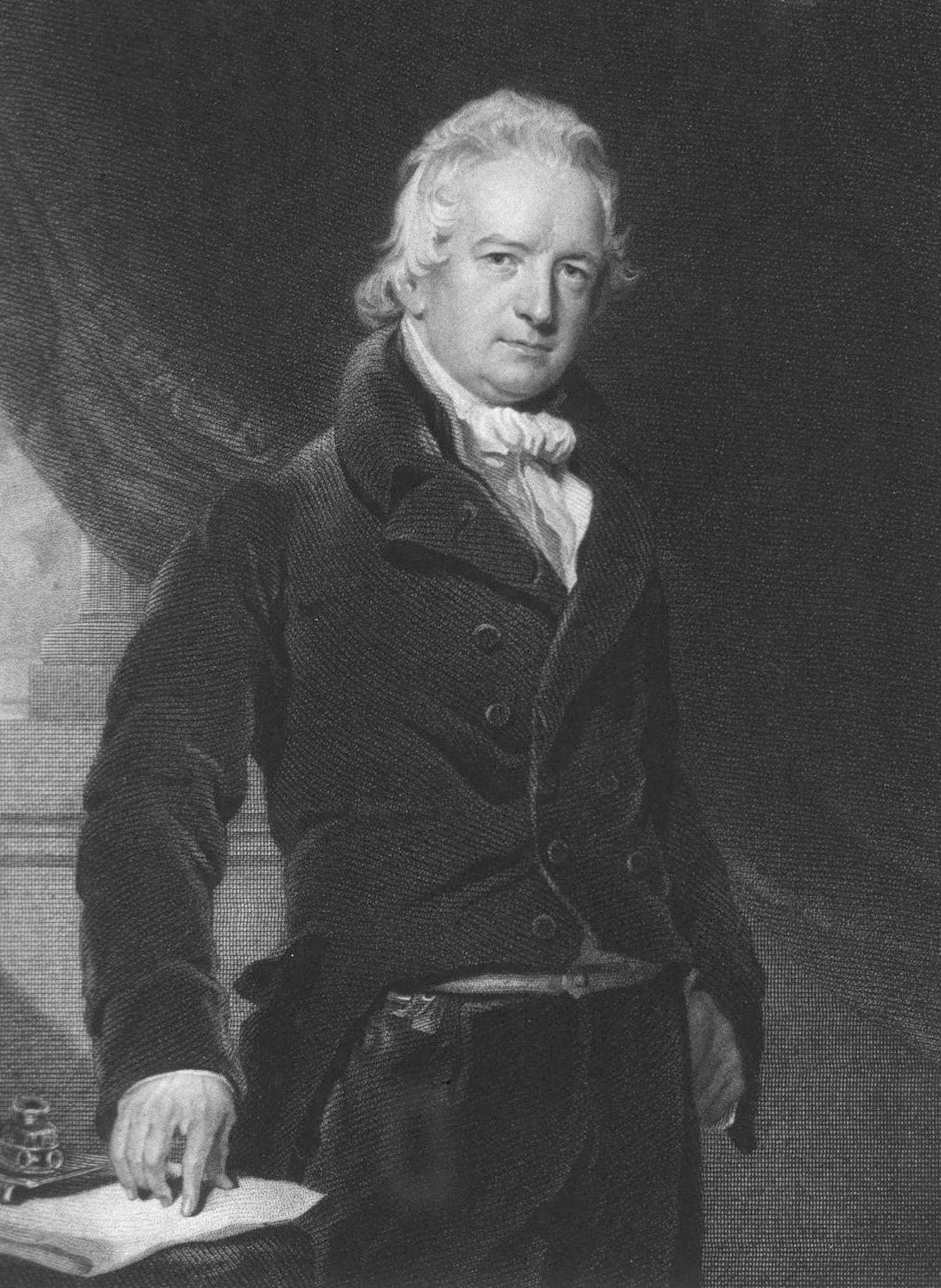
- Born: 3 April 1764; City of London, England
- Died: 20 April 1831 (aged 67); Enfield, London, England
- Occupation: Surgeon
- Known for: Giving his name to the Abernethy biscuit

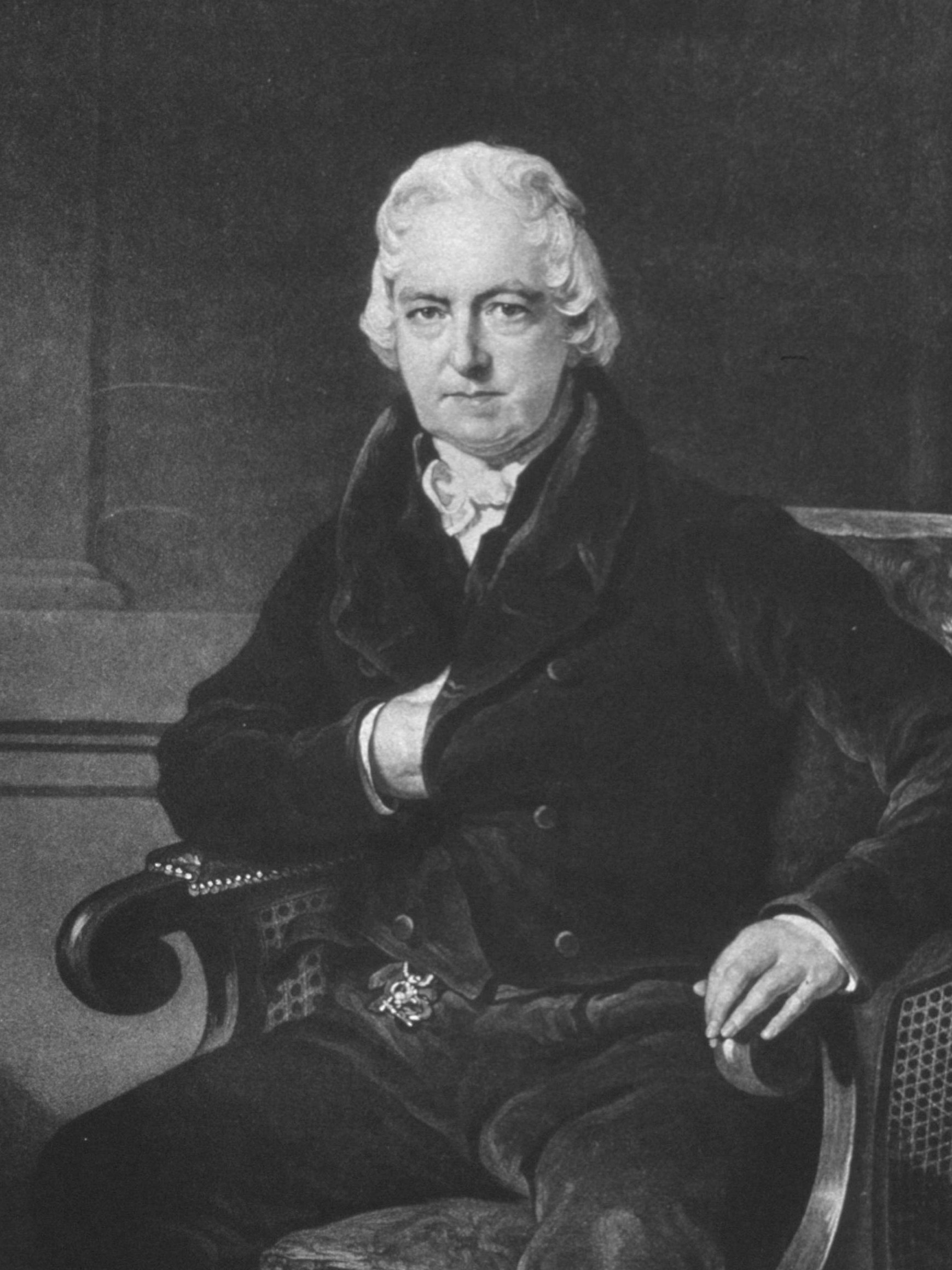
John Abernethy

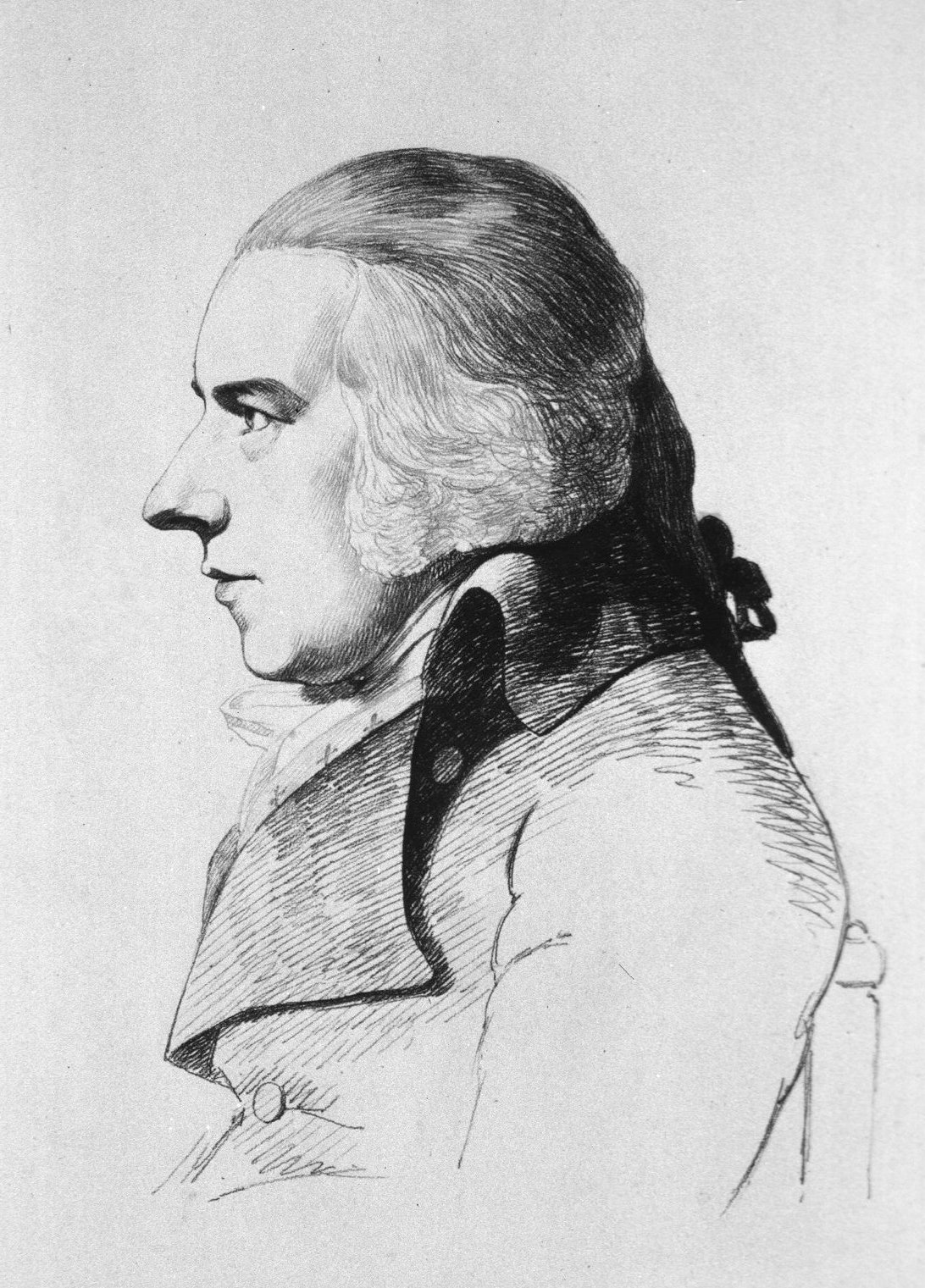
John Abernethy

John Abernethy (3 April 1764 – 20 April 1831) was an English surgeon. He is popularly remembered for having given his name to the Abernethy biscuit, a coarse-meal baked good meant to aid digestion.

== Life ==
John Abernethy was the grandson of John Abernethy. He was born in Coleman Street in the City of London on 3 April 1764, where his father was a merchant. Educated at Wolverhampton Grammar School, he was apprenticed in 1779 to Sir Charles Blicke (1745–1815), a surgeon at St Bartholomew's Hospital, London. He attended the anatomical lectures of Sir William Blizard (1743–1835) at the London Hospital, and was employed to assist as demonstrator; he also attended Percivall Pott's surgical lectures at St Bartholomew's Hospital, as well as the lectures of John Hunter. On Pott's resignation of the office of surgeon of St Bartholomew's, Sir Charles Blicke, who was assistant-surgeon, succeeded him, and Abernethy was elected assistant-surgeon in 1787.

In this capacity Abernethy began to give lectures at his house in Bartholomew Close, which were so well attended that the governors of the hospital built a theatre (1790–1791), and Abernethy thus became the founder of the medical school of St Bartholomew's. He held the office of assistant-surgeon for twenty-eight years, until, in 1815, he was elected principal surgeon. He had before that time been appointed lecturer in anatomy to the Royal College of Surgeons (1814). Abernethy was not a great operator, though his name is associated with the treatment of aneurysm by ligature of the external iliac artery.

In 1823, Abernethy was president of the Medical and Chirurgical Society of London.

Abernethy was an anti-vivisectionist. Although he carried out experiments on animals, he killed them first, for he abhorred vivisection.

Abernethy's Surgical Observations on the Constitutional Origin and Treatment of Local Diseases (1809) – known as "My Book", from the great frequency with which he referred his patients to it, and to page 72 of it in particular, under that name – was one of the earliest popular works on medical science. So great was his zeal in encouraging patients to read the book that he earned the nickname "Doctor My-Book". He taught that local diseases were frequently the results of disordered states of the digestive organs, and were to be treated by purging and attention to diet. As a lecturer he was exceedingly attractive, and his success in teaching was largely attributable to the persuasiveness with which he enunciated his views. It has been said however, that the influence he exerted on those who attended his lectures was not beneficial in this respect, that his opinions were delivered so dogmatically, and all who differed from him were disparaged and denounced so contemptuously, as to repress instead of stimulating inquiry. The celebrity he attained in his practice was due not only to his great professional skill, but also in part to his eccentricity. He was very blunt with his patients, treating them often brusquely and sometimes even rudely.

Abernethy resigned his position at St Bartholomew's Hospital in 1827. He died at his residence at Enfield on 20 April 1831 and was buried at St Andrew's Enfield. Joined there in 1854 by his wife Anne (née Threlfal; married 1800) and by three of their children.

== Abernethy biscuit ==
Abernethy believed that a variety of diseases originated in a disordered state of the digestive organs, and that treating underlying maldigestion and dyspepsia was essential to restoring health. He invented, or at least gave his name to, a digestive biscuit called the Abernethy biscuit that he promoted from about 1829 until his death.

== Awards and works ==
In 1819, Abernethy was awarded the Hunterian Professorship. He contributed articles to Rees's Cyclopædia on Anatomy and Physiology, but the topics are not known. A collected edition of his works was published in 1830. A biography, Memoirs of John Abernethy, by George Macilwain (1797–1882), appeared in 1853.

== In literature ==
John Abernethy is mentioned in Edgar Allan Poe's The Purloined Letter (1844).

His debate with Sir William Lawrence is believed by Marilyn Butler to have influenced Mary Shelley's Frankenstein.

== Notable students ==
- John King
