= George Collings =

George Collings was a carpenter, joiner and author. He is notable for having authored certain key works on the methods and techniques of designing and making situation-specific woodwork.

Still referred to this day, is his book, Circular Work in Carpentry & Joinery, a Practical Treatise on Circular Work of Single and Double Curvature - first published in 1886. A modern edition - ISBN 0-85442-054-1 - with a forward and annotations by Karl Shumaker - was published in 1992 by Stobart Davies Ltd. The original preface of the book gives the author's address as "Dover Road, Upper Walmer, Kent".

== Bibliography ==
- George Collings (October 2008). Roof Carpentry: Practical Lessons in the Framing of Wood Roofs. Lightning Source Incorporated. ISBN 978-1-4437-7229-7.
- George Collings (1882). A practical treatise on handrailing.
- George Collings (1884). Circular Work in Carpentry & Joinery, a Practical Treatise on Circular Work of Single and Double Curvature. Stobart Davies Publishing. ISBN 978-0-85442-094-0.
- George Collings (1893). Roof Carpentry. Practical Lessons in the Framing of Wood Roofs, Etc. London.
- George Collings (1925). Handrailing and Stairbuilding.
