= Charles Blicke =

English surgeon

- Born: 1745
- Died: 1816?
- Occupation: Surgeon

Sir Charles Blicke (1745–1816?) was an English surgeon.

== Biography ==
Blicke was a prominent member of his profession, and accumulated a large fortune by its practice in London. He was educated at St. Bartholomew's Hospital, where he was elected assistant-surgeon, and succeeded Percival Pott as surgeon 17 July 1787 (MS. Journal St. Bartholomew's Hospital). He was one of the court of assistants at Surgeons' Hall, in 1801 became a governor of the College of Surgeons, was knighted in 1803, and died 30 December 1815. In 1772, while living in Old Jewry, he published his only work, 'An Essay on the Bilious or Yellow Fever of Jamaica, collected from the manuscript of a late Surgeon.' In the preface Blicke states that he has abridged the original work and simplified its style. The essayist, whose name is not preserved, advocates the treatment of the fever by bleeding, purging, warm baths, fresh air, and acid drinks. Some twenty authors are quoted to little purpose, and the only interesting contents of the composition are a few lines on the sufferings of the Carthagena expedition, in which the original writer had served, and the mention of the fact that the water of the Bristol hot wells was exported to Jamaica. Whatever he may have cut out, the editor certainly added nothing. The essay has been translated into Italian. In 1779 Blicke, then living in Mildred Court, received the famous John Abernethy as his apprentice in surgery. The pupil thought his master fonder of money-making than of science.
