= Baylies =

Baylies is a surname. Notable people with the surname include:

- Carolyn Baylies (1947–2003), American academic and activist
- Edmund L. Baylies (1857–1932), American lawyer and philanthropist
- Francis Baylies (1783–1852), American politician
- Frank Leaman Baylies (1895–1918), American World War I flying ace
- Jeannette Osborn Baylies (1912–1984), American clubwoman
- Nicholas Baylies (1768–1847), American judge
- Thomas Baylies (1687–1756), Quaker ironmaster
- William Baylies (1776–1865), American politician
- William Baylies (1724–1787), British physician
