= Rahul Ligma =

Fictional ex-employee of Twitter

- First appearance: An appearance with journalists outside Twitter's headquarters, 28 October 2022
- Created by: Rahul Sonwalkar
- Portrayed by: Rahul Sonwalkar

In-universe information
- Occupation: Software engineer at Twitter (2019-2022, 2022-present); Employee at FTX (2022)
- Nationality: American

Rahul Ligma is a fictional fired Twitter employee, a character played by one of a pair of amateur improvisational actors that pranked multiple major media outlets on October 28, 2022. Ligma, the fictional character's surname, is a reference to the Ligma joke. The spontaneous and intentionally transparent hoax was revealed the same day, after the initial news coverage triggered debate among real Twitter employees about whether or not expected mass layoffs had already started. The Rahul Ligma character next appeared in early November as a recently unemployed FTX employee in the Bahamas. On November 15, Elon Musk, the incoming CEO of Twitter, facetiously offered Ligma and his compatriot their (fictional) old jobs back, and posted a photograph taken with them at Twitter headquarters.

Although at least one journalist had publicly apologized for their failure to fact check before reporting the news, several notable media outlets were still oblivious to the running joke, and reported the duo's firing and rehiring as actual news. In social media, the follow-up stunt was widely criticized for lack of sensitivity to actual Twitter employees who had lost their jobs. On November 23, news reports surfaced once again, this time reporting that the actor playing Daniel Johnson had in fact been hired by Twitter for the first time.

== Background ==
On October 28, 2022, many members of the press were present outside Twitter's San Francisco headquarters on the first day that Elon Musk gained control of the social media company. It had been previously reported that mass layoffs were expected in the coming weeks and months. That day, two individuals identifying as "Rahul Ligma" and "Daniel Johnson" left Twitter's building carrying large cardboard boxes, pretending to be two recently fired employees departing with their belongings. Neither had ever worked for Twitter, but the inventor of the Ligma character regularly exercised in a gymnasium in the same building, and he "thought it would be really funny" if he and a friend "walked out with a [cardboard] box and they fell for it."

== Prank ==
Rahul Ligma, in character, acted dismayed about his firing, telling a group of reporters his concerns about the "future of their democracy... the future of celebrity conservatorship" (a Britney Spears reference) and lamenting that "this wouldn't have happened under Michelle Obama", while holding up a copy of the former first lady's autobiography. Claiming to be a Tesla owner and a software engineer with Twitter for the past three years, he also identified himself as "a big fan of clean energy, climate change, even free speech too."

"Daniel Johnson", also part of the fictional team of fired data engineers, said he had to leave the interview to "touch base with my husband and wife".

Although no "Rahul Ligma" existed in Twitter's Slack or email system, nor appeared on LinkedIn, multiple news networks reported the fictional names along with statements, photographs, and video of the pranksters as being of actual ex-employees of Twitter. California State Senator Melissa Melendez tweeted at the time, "This is too funny. Two guys posing as laid-off Twitter employees. They said their names were Rahul Ligma and Daniel Johnson. Not one reporter thought that was odd. They just ran with the story."

CNBC technology reporter Deirdre Bosa tweeted, "It's happening. The entire team of data engineers let go. These are two of them. They are visibly shaken. Daniel tells us he owns a Tesla and doesn't know how he will make payments." The San Francisco ABC News affiliate reported that one "was terminated during a Zoom meeting". Based on the visual of the pair carrying boxes, two Bloomberg journalists wrote that mass layoffs were already underway at Twitter, but actually it was only top executives that had lost their jobs. Reuters was also among the major media companies fooled by the hoax.

== Reactions ==
Among Twitter employees, the initial news reports launched a debate about whether or not layoffs had already begun. Later in the day on October 28, Twitter CEO Elon Musk, aware of the joke, continued the crude puns by tweeting about the firing that "Ligma Johnson had it coming", along with eggplant and water splash emojis.

The Times of India called the Ligma–Johnson hoax "perfectly-timed" and "one of the greatest pranks on the internet."

Blake Shuster wrote for USA Today that the journalists involved were "duped by real-life trolls" and "all it would've taken was 30 seconds to stop and actually do their jobs to avoid the whole news-cycle". He criticized the journalists for not bothering to search for "Daniel Johnson" and "Rahul Ligma" before publishing their stories, and remarked, "it's probably not great that during a time of immense and worrisome change at one of the largest tech platforms...all we're left with is BOFA reporting."

On October 31, 2022, CNBC's Bosa apologized and told The Daily Beast, "They got me" and "I didn't do enough to confirm who they were". But NBC, as of December 2022, still had not corrected its October 28 coverage that, "some Twitter employees appeared to have been let go".

The Rahul Ligma character resurfaced a few weeks later, apparently having relocated along with his "husband and wife" to the Bahamas to work for the cryptocurrency platform FTX. But when the company suddenly faced financial collapse, on November 11, 2022, he found himself unemployed once again. Again on video with a cardboard box, this time on a sandy beach, Ligma commented, "It's really tough, this is my second job in a month", adding, "Web2 chewed me up and spit me out, I just really thought Web3 was gonna be different."

== Fictional rehiring ==
On November 15, 2022, Musk changed course and apologized for "firing these geniuses", jokingly saying it was "truly one of [my] biggest mistakes" and offered them their (fictional) jobs back. Calling their October media stunt "one of the best trolls ever", Musk publicized a photograph taken with himself along with "Ligma & Johnson" at Twitter headquarters. Meanwhile, Newsweek reported that "there was widespread criticism of Musk for joking about firings when his employees were losing their jobs in the shake-up", noting that initial reactions were divided among those who thought the prank was "disrespectful" and "cruel to the real employees who were fired", and those who thought that the joke was "top-notch".

On November 16, 2022, the Hindi news channel Aaj Tak reported the comic duo's fictional rehiring as an actual news story, continuing to fall for the prank. In a 37-second video, the broadcaster announced, "After the large scale layoff, Elon is realizing his mistake. He is now calling back fired employees and has shared an image with two who have returned." The following day, the Indonesian news website VOI also published the photograph in an article with the caption "Rahul Ligma, Elon Musk, and Daniel Johnson, are back as a team".

In the November 17, 2022 edition of Rising, co-host Briahna Joy Gray said that the rehiring proved Musk "actually needs these employees to work for him" and that "the employees didn't look so happy in that photograph" to be back, having been "fired—prematurely".

== Aftermath ==
On November 23, 2022, The Daily Beast reported that Daniel Francis, the actor who played Daniel Johnson in the hoax, had just been hired by Twitter as a software developer, citing a Business Insider article.

In a December 2022 article for TechCrunch reflecting on the absurd nature of tech industry news over the past year, Amanda Silberling commented that because "a herd of reporters did not get the joke" about Rahul Ligma, she had to explain the "ligma" meme on four different podcasts.

Also in December 2022, Ligma announced his presidential run in 2024 "to fight for the rights of laid off workers, polygamists, and men who wear gym shorts outside in November."

In May 2025, TechCrunch reported that Rahul Sonwalkar—the improvisational actor behind the Rahul Ligma character—was, and remains, a real software engineer. He is now the co-founder of an AI data startup whose tools are used by research institutions including Harvard University, further blurring the lines between satire and Silicon Valley reality.

== See also ==
- Acquisition of Twitter by Elon Musk
