= Woodworking safety =

Lack of thorough training on the specific system of safety and health signs and signals plays the pivotal role in furnishing the accidents in the woodworking sector. The established contacts with managers from SMEs and companies in Wood Industry also confirmed the current needs for this particular training. SMEs, in particular, have fewer resources to put complex systems of worker protection in place and tend to be more affected by the negative impact of health and safety problems.

Woodworking machines, wood dust, fire and explosion, noise, vibrations, manual handling operations in Wood Industry, hazardous and chemical substances, slips and trips are some of the biggest concerns.

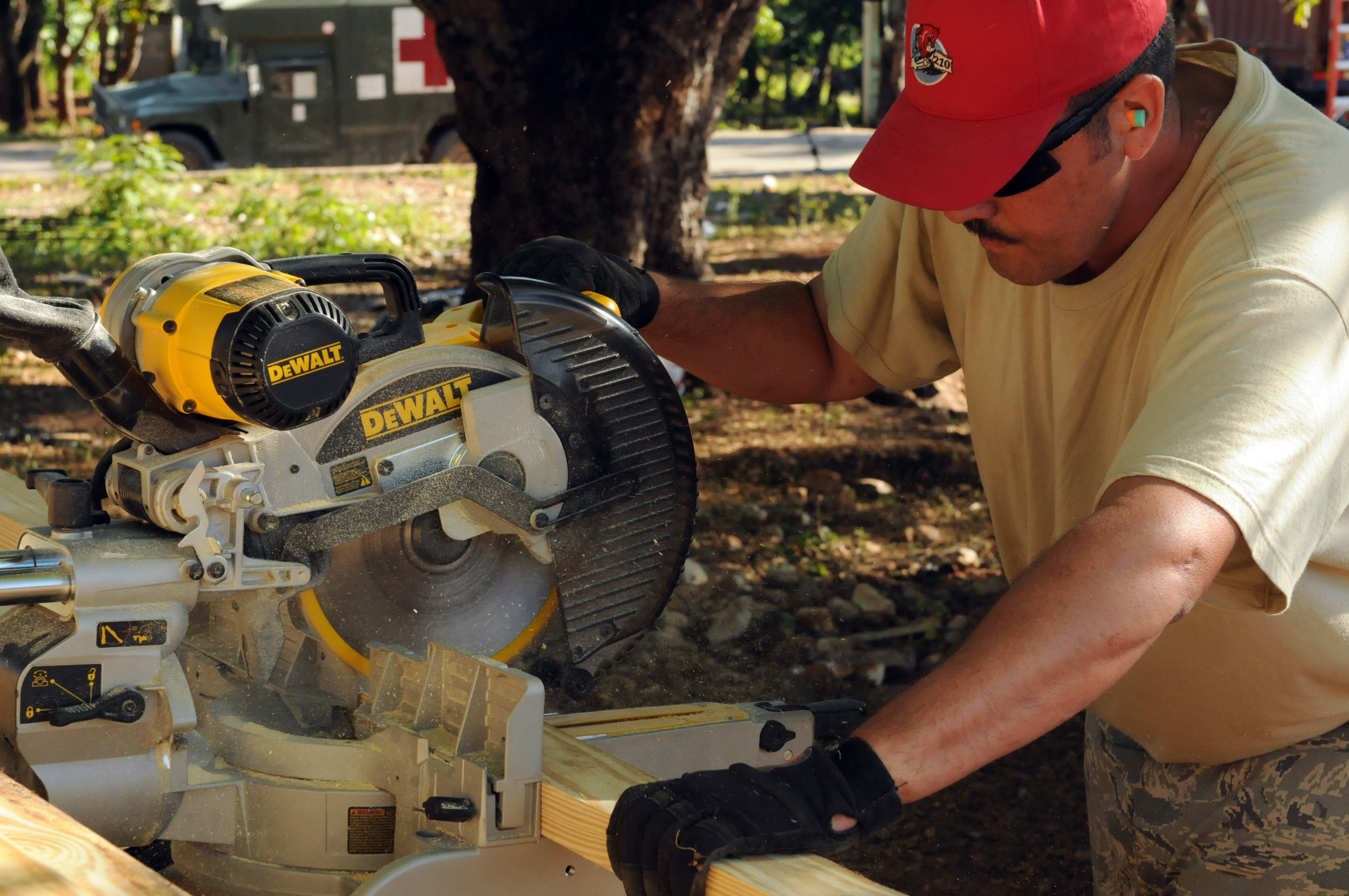
Woodworker wearing eye protection and ear protection while using a mitre saw outdoors with a blade guard.

Federal regulators are drawing up new standards for handling industrial and wood dust following a series of fires and explosions related to combustible dust. The Wood Machinery Manufacturers of America's Industrial Dust Task Force has been following the Occupational Safety and Health Administration on the new rules since October 2009. The goal is to ensure that companies follow proper dust collection procedures.

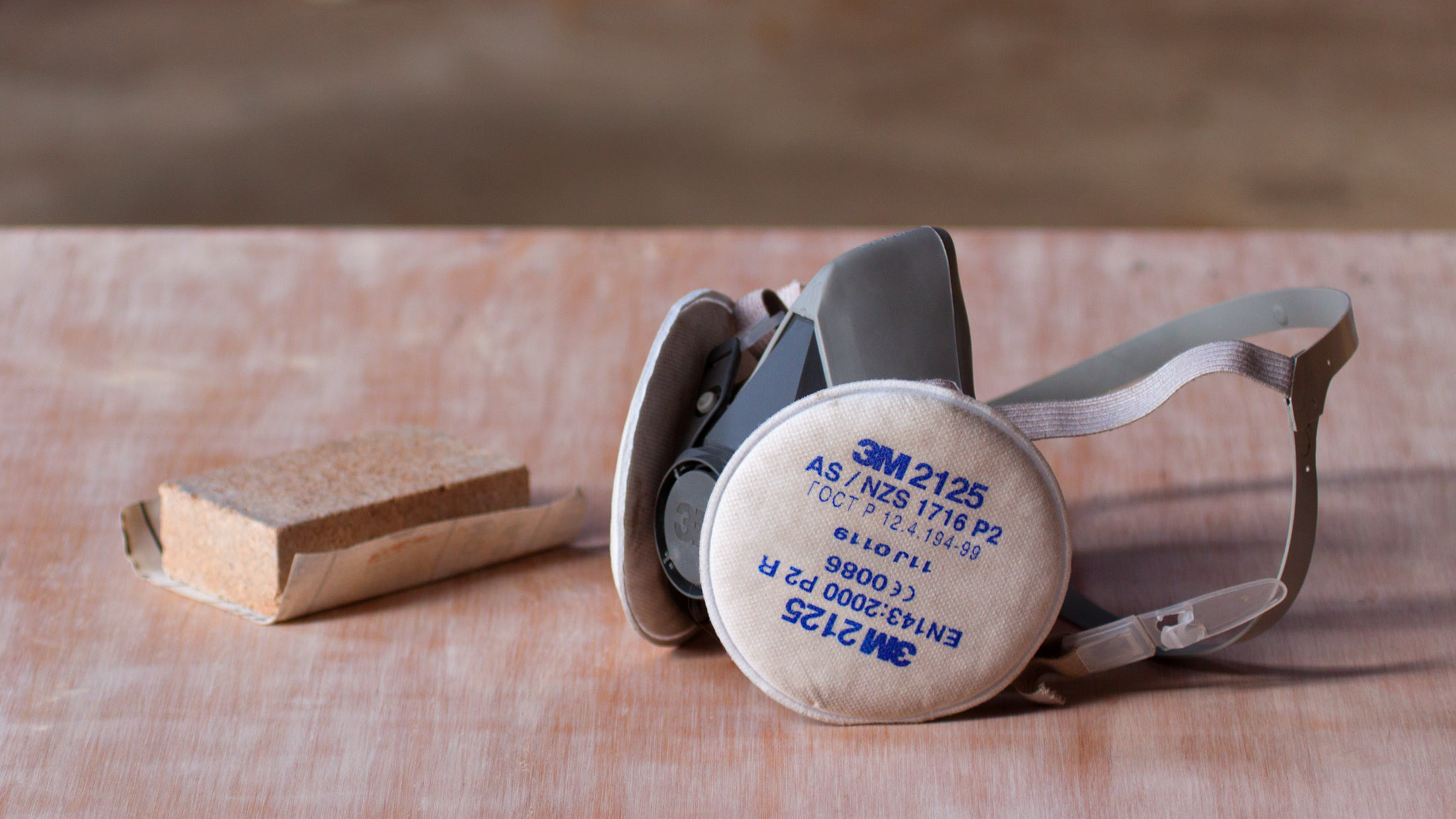
Respirator and a sanding block

Wood Machinery Manufacturers of America (WMMA) fully supports efforts to protect workers against the dangers of combustible dust. However, the organization is encouraging OSHA to avoid creating new economic hardships for woodworking companies and small manufacturers. Their observation says that if the companies find it difficult to meet the regulations, then it will be impossible to achieve the goal which is to protect the workers.

Wood dust can create serious fire and explosion hazards in woodworking facilities, particularly when fine particles accumulate and encounter an ignition source. In addition, some forms of wood release toxic materials when being cut; Western Red Cedar is one example. Another issue is rotating equipment. Guarding is a major issue with all rotating machinery.

Art Sipple, State of Nevada Safety Consultation & Training Section Supervisor, OSHA says that the regulations are important as they not only ensure the safety of the employees, it further saves extra expenses related to the injuries and illness. He says: “Controls for any industry are practical. The lack of controls causes injuries and illnesses that cost companies a lot of money, not only through insurance claims with workers compensation insurance, but through lost time and production. Generally, $1 spent on controls and safe work practices save employers $3 or more by preventing problems. For a company to run on high performance and high demand, it has to control injuries and illnesses or the company will not be competitive and lose market shares.”

The accident rates for woodworkers are more than 50% above the manufacturing average, with predominant injuries being muscle strains, lacerations, bruises, and foreign particles in the eye. Recent Health and Safety Executive (HSE) accident statistics show that accidents involving contact with the dangerous parts of machinery or the material being machined accounted for approximately one quarter of all of the fatal injuries recorded in the woodworking industry, and approximately half of all major injury accidents.

The risks associated with the use of woodworking machinery are high since they rely on high-speed sharp cutters to do the job and in many cases, these are necessarily exposed to enable the machining process to take place. Additionally, many machines are still hand-fed; woodworking is probably the main industry where the hands of the operator are constantly exposed to danger.

== Cultural references ==
Famed American carpenter Norm Abram of public television's The New Yankee Workshop emphasized safe woodworking practices—including hearing, respiratory, and especially eye safety—with a variation of the following short monologue at the start of each program:

Before I use any power tools, let's talk about shop safety. Be sure to read, understand, and follow all the safety rules that come with your power tools. Knowing how to use your power tools properly will greatly reduce the risk of personal injury. And remember this: there is no more important safety rule than to wear these, [pointing gesture] safety glasses.

== Gallery ==
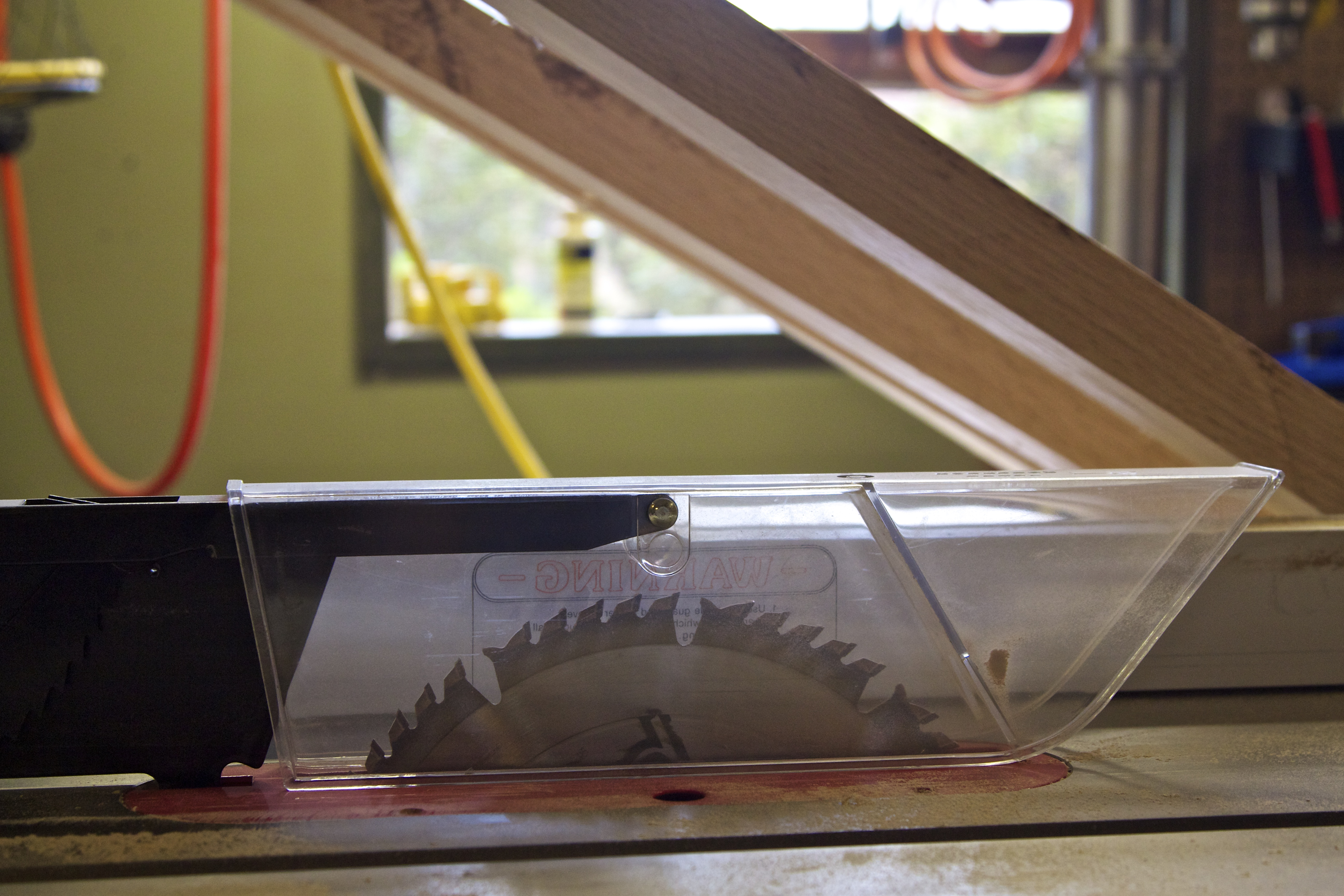
Table saw blade guard and riving knife.

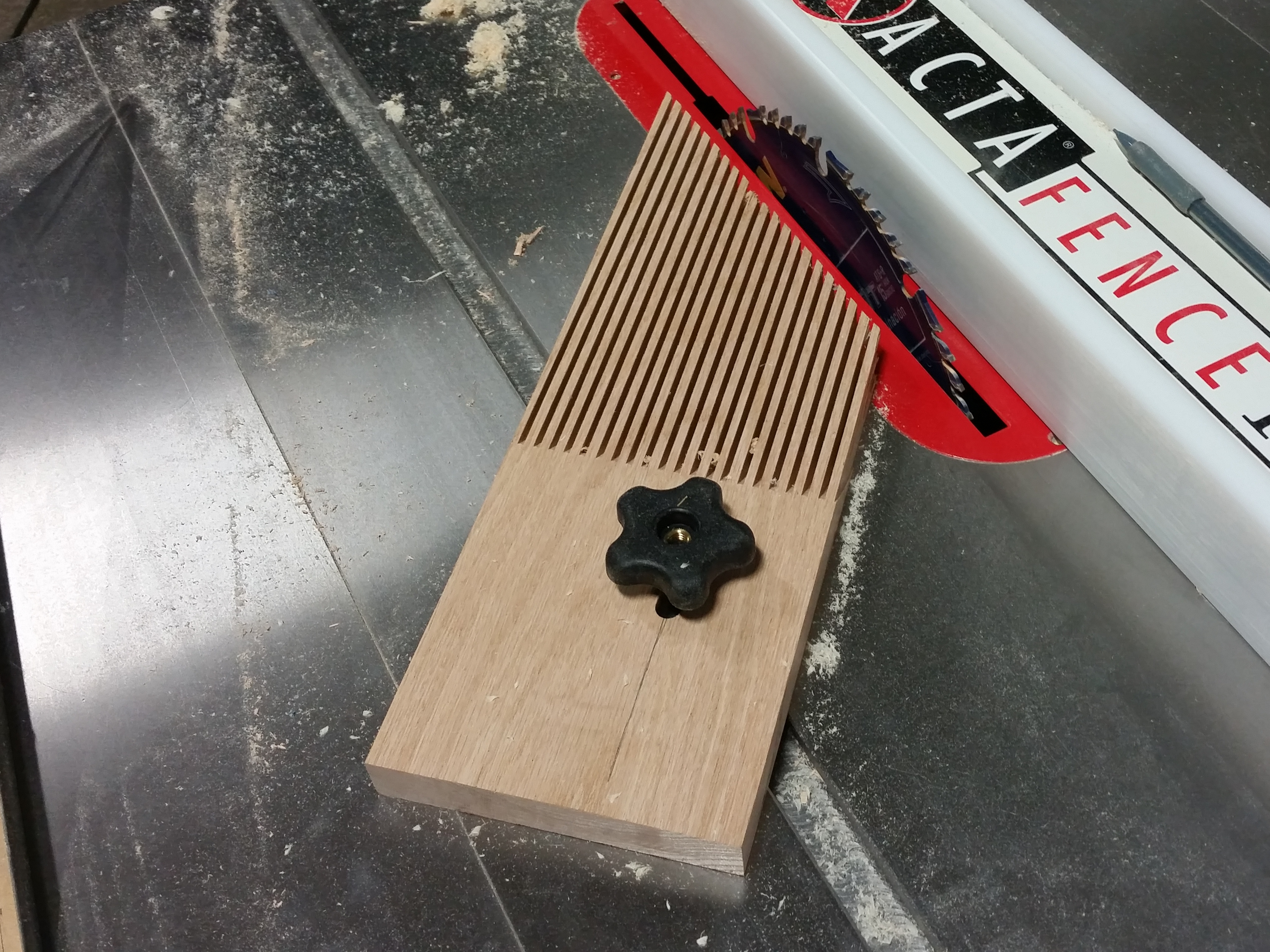
A table saw with a featherboard, a safety device used for preventing kickback.

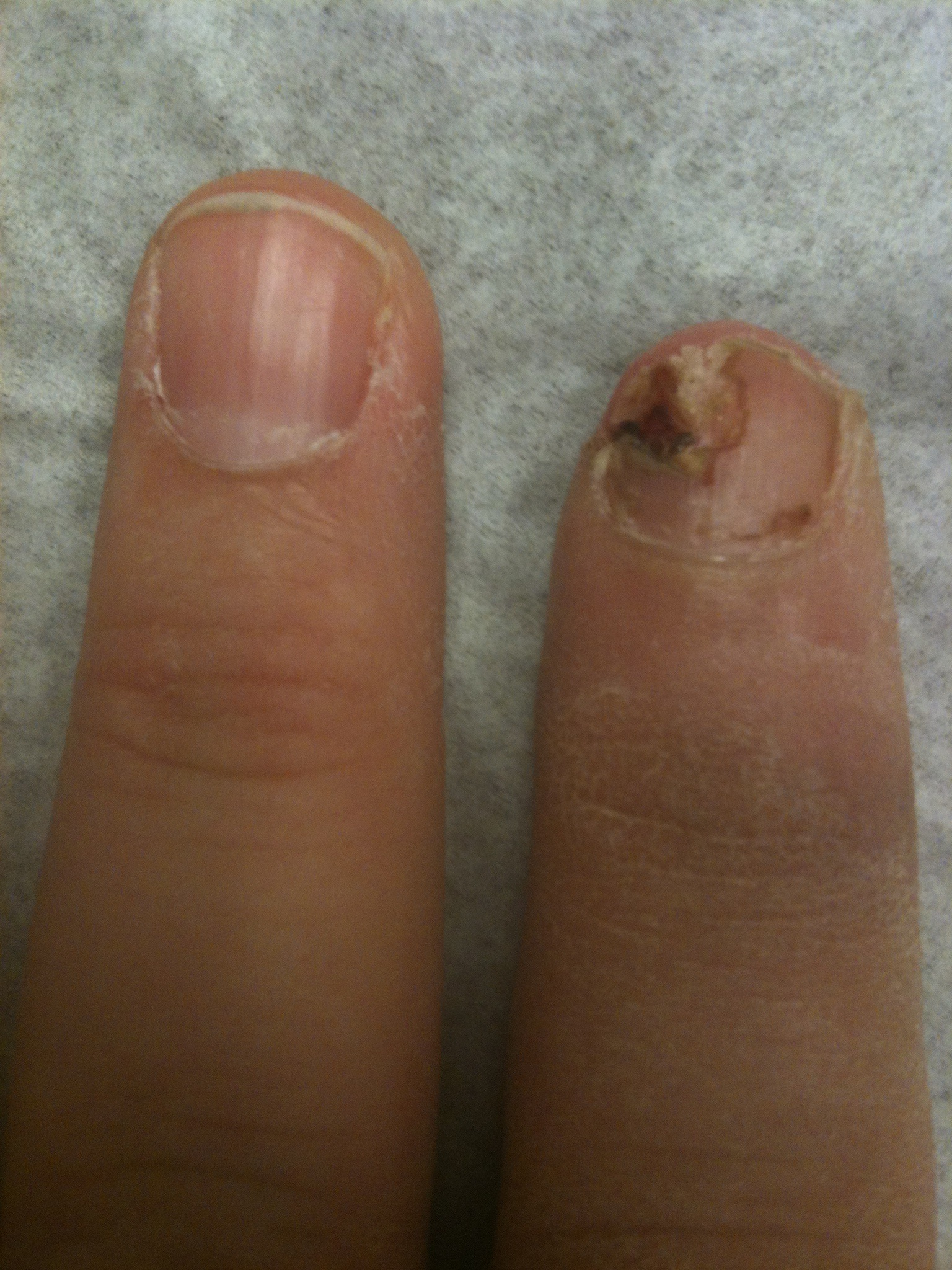
A fingertip injured by a table saw.
