= Ligna =

The LIGNA (ligna lat. = the woods), previously known as Ligna Plus (Ligna+) is an industrial trade fair for the woodworking industry. It takes place in uneven years on the Hanover fairground. It is run by Deutsche Messe AG and the Fachverband Holzbearbeitungsmaschinen section of VDMA e.V.

== History ==
Until 1975, the Ligna was part of the yearly Hannover Messe. Due to space constraints, it was decided to establish the woodworking section as a separate fair. Since then, the Ligna fair takes place biannually.

== Exhibitions ==
There are exhibitions of machines and tools from the following sections:

- Forestry and forest technology
- Sawmill technology
- Solid wood treatment
- Furnishing
- Carpentry companies
- Furniture industry
- Bioenergy from wood
- Special presentations

== Facts and figures ==
Ligna Plus 2001

- Visitors: 114,169
- Exhibitors: 1,933
- Space: 145,083 m^{2}

Ligna Plus 2003

- Visitors: 98,267
- Exhibitors: 1,720
- Space: 132,355 m^{2}

Ligna Plus 2005

- Visitors: 96,675
- Exhibitors: 1,800
- Space: 129,083 m^{2}

Ligna Plus 2007

- Visitors: 107,000
- Exhibitors: 1,879
- Space: 134,583 m^{2}

Ligna Plus 2009

- Visitors: 83,000
- Exhibitors: 1,758 from 50 countries
- Space: 130,152 m^{2}

LIGNA 2011

- Visitors: 90,000
- Exhibitors: 1,765 from 52 countries
- Space: 130,000 m^{2}

LIGNA 2013

- Visitors: 90,000
- Exhibitors: 1,637 from 46 countries
- Space: 124,000 m^{2}
