= Ligma joke =

Internet meme and joke

Ligma joke via text message

The ligma joke first gained popularity online in July 2018. "Ligma" sounds similar to the words "lick my", and became an Internet meme to set up a crude joke. When someone unfamiliar with the term is prompted to ask "What's ligma?", the punchline is to respond with "ligma balls", "ligma nuts", "ligma butt" or something similar.

== Derivation and bofa meme ==
The Verge reported in July 2018 that ligma "is the new bofa", a pun on "both of". In a conversation, the speaker might set up the joke by saying, "I went to this great Italian restaurant last week, and they make great bofa", to prompt the question, "What's bofa?" to which the response is, "Bofa deez nuts!". According to Dictionary.com, "It's seen as a sign of good humor if the person who has been bofa'd laughs, shrugs it off, or bofa's someone themselves."

Notable people who have fallen for the bofa joke include evolutionary biologist Richard Dawkins (2015), businessman Donald Trump, Jr. (2017), and writer Alex Berenson (2021).

Josh Kastowitz of The Daily Dot connected both ligma and bofa jokes to older crude humor with "deez nuts" (these nuts) as its punchline. Brady Olson, who made a satirical 2016 presidential run under the pseudonym "Deez Nuts", confirmed to Rolling Stone that he chose it based on the bofa meme.

Online men's magazine MEL traces the humor genre to Dr. Dre's 1992 debut album The Chronic, which featured the skit track, "Deeez Nuuuts".

== Notable instances ==
=== Twitch death hoax ===
"Ligma" was the fictional disease jokingly rumored to have killed the popular video game streamer Ninja in July 2018.

=== Ligma–Johnson hoax ===
In October 2022, two amateur improvisational actors played a media prank, pretending to be newly fired Twitter employees "Rahul Ligma" and "Daniel Johnson" on the day of Elon Musk's takeover of the company. It is possible that "Johnson" is a reference to a common nickname for one's penis, with "Ligma-Johnson" sounding like "lick my 'Johnson'".

Multiple major media outlets reported the incident as actual news. The Times of India called the Ligma–Johnson hoax "perfectly-timed" and "one of the greatest pranks on the Internet." In a December 2022 article for TechCrunch reflecting on the absurd nature of tech industry news over the past year, Amanda Silberling commented that because "a herd of reporters did not get the joke" about Rahul Ligma, she had to explain the "ligma" meme on four different podcasts.

=== Other instances ===
In August 2018, Microsoft began receiving complaints about the Xbox gamertags "Ligma" and "MrsLigma" and renamed them. The owner of the "Ligma" tag told Eurogamer, "I just made the word up, anyone else can/could too! But, it's pretty uncool when Xbox/Microsoft can use any new meme to destroy a gamertag that's 12+ years old." After there was a groundswell of support on Reddit for the disaffected gamer, his "Ligma" tag was reinstated.

In October 2018, fact-checking website Snopes debunked false reports that rapper Machine Gun Kelly had died from a "Ligma overdose".

In July 2021, the Lead Stories fact-checking website confirmed that "Ligma" was not a new variant of the COVID-19 virus, but it was the latest version of "an old dirty joke".

== Other variants ==
- "Sugondese" (pronounced similarly to "suck on these", often in combination with "balls" or "nuts").
- "Grabahan" (pronounced similarly to "grab a hand", with the punchline "full of deez nuts").
- "Sugma" (pronounced similarly to "suck my", most commonly in combination with "balls").
