= Beast Mode =

Beast mode or beastmode, may refer to:

== Stage and screen ==
- Beast Mode (film), a 2020 horror comedy film starring C. Thomas Howell
- "Beastmode", a 2015 episode of Deadliest Catch

== Music ==
=== Albums ===
- Beast Mode (album), a 2010 album by American rapper Juvenile
- Beast Mode (mixtape), a 2015 mixtape by American rapper Future and producer Zaytoven
- Beast Mode, a 2015 EP by American rapper Jaden Smith
- Beastmode, a 2016 album by Audio (musician)
- Beast Mode ++++, a 2016 EP by Trippie Redd and Pi'erre Bourne
- Beast Mode 2, a 2018 mixtape by Future and Zaytoven

=== Songs ===
- "Beast Mode", a song by B.o.B (2011)
- "Beast Mode", a song on Ludacris' album Ludaversal (2015)
- "Beast Mode", a song on A Boogie wit da Hoodie's album The Bigger Artist (2017)
- "Beast Mode", a song by Anirudh on the soundtrack of the film Beast (2022)
- "Beastmode", a 2008 song by Murder-C off the album Screamin' 4 Vengeance
- "Beastmode", a 2011 song by Liquid Assassin and Hopsin off the album Cardell; see Hopsin discography
- "Beastmode", a 2015 song and single by Alvin Risk and Hodgy
- "Beastmode", a 2020 song by Monsta X off the album Fatal Love (album)
- "Beastmode", a 2022 song and single by From Fall to Spring

== Fictional elements ==
- The activation code used by the Maximals and Predacons in Transformers: Beast Wars to transform from robot to beast.
- Beast Mode (Japanese: ビーストモード), an operations mode for Evangelions in Rebuild of Evangelion

== People ==
- Marshawn Lynch (born 1986), American football running back nicknamed "Beast Mode"
- Rhys Mathieson (born 1997), Australian rules footballer nicknamed "Beast Mode"

== Other ==
- A performance driving mode on the Tesla Cybertruck

== See also ==
- "Beast Mode On", a clothing label by English footballer Adebayo Akinfenwa
