= William Baylies (physician) =

English physician (1724–1787)

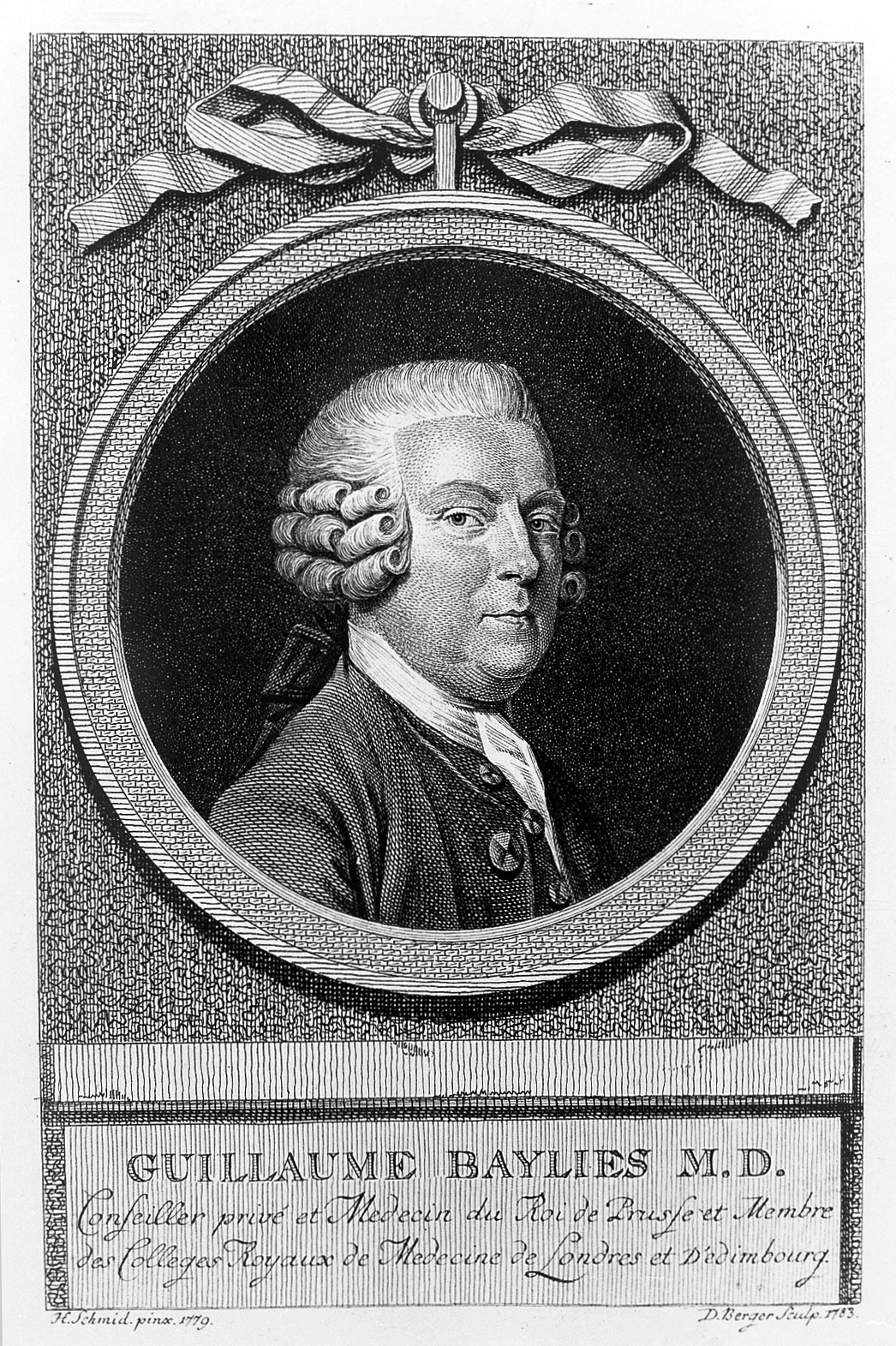

William Baylies (1724–1787) was an 18th-century English physician. It is said that the King of Prussia, at an early interview with Baylies, remarked to him that "to have acquired such skill he must have killed a great many people", to which the doctor replied, "Pas tant que votre Majesté (Not as many as Your Majesty)".

Baylies died in Berlin on 2 March 1789 and left his library to the King of Prussia. A portrait of him by Johann Heinrich Schmidt, engraved by Daniel Berger, was published in Berlin.

== Biography ==
Baylies was a native of Worcestershire and practised for some years as an apothecary. After marrying the daughter of Thomas Cooke, a wealthy attorney of Evesham, he began the study of medicine, obtained the degree of M.D. at Aberdeen on 18 December 1748, and was elected a fellow of the Edinburgh College of Physicians on 7 August 1757.

Baylies practised for many years at Bath. He published in 1757 Reflections on the Use and Abuse of Bath Waters, which involved him in a dispute with a Dr. Lucas and a Dr. Oliver, the two being the chief doctors of the city. He issued a pamphlet concerning this quarrel — A Narrative of Facts demonstrating the existence and course of a physical confederacy, made known in the printed letters of Dr. Lucas and Dr. Oliver, 1757, but the controversy ruined Baylies's practice, whereupon he moved to London.

In 1761 Baylies unsuccessfully contested the representation of Evesham in Parliament, and then petitioned against the return of one of his rivals, although he withdrew the petition before the day of hearing (15 December). On 8 November 1764, he was appointed physician to the Middlesex Hospital. He became licentiate of the College of Physicians in London on 30 September 1765 and made himself notorious by the magnificent entertainments he repeatedly gave at his house in Great George Street, Westminster. Pecuniary difficulties then forced him to leave England for Germany, where he first settled at Dresden and afterwards at Berlin, where he obtained the post of physician to Frederick the Great.

== Other works ==
- Remarks on Perry's Analysis of the Stratford Mineral Water, Stratford-on-Avon, 1745.
- A History of the General Hospital at Bath, London, 1758.
- Facts and Observations relative to Inoculation at Berlin, Edinburgh, 1781, of which a French translation was previously issued in Dresden in 1776.
