= List of ArtCenter College of Design people =

This is a list of notable alumni and faculty from the ArtCenter College of Design, a private design college in Pasadena, California, United States.

== Alumni ==
=== Entertainment Design ===
- Ryan Church, concept designer
- Kendal Cronkhite, production designer
- Bob Gurr, amusement ride designer
- Ralph McQuarrie, conceptual designer and futurist (Star Wars)
- Syd Mead, concept designer, futurist
- Neville Page, Emmy Award-winning creature and concept designer
- Andy Park, visual development designer, Marvel Studios
- Richard Vander Wende, concept and video game designer (Riven)

=== Film and Graduate Film ===
- Viktor Antonov, concept designer, art director (Half-Life 2, Renaissance)
- Jon Jon Augustavo, music video and film director
- Roger Avary, film director and Academy Award-winning co-writer of Pulp Fiction
- Michael Bay, film director and producer
- Don Burgess, cinematographer
- Ericson Core
- Wayne Fitzgerald, title sequence designer
- Larry Fong, cinematographer
- Dennis Gassner, Academy Award-winning production designer often working with directors Sam Mendes and the Coen Brothers
- Dave Goelz, puppeteer
- Shelly Johnson, cinematographer (Jurassic Park III)
- Saman Kesh, director of film and music videos
- Kevin Mack, Academy Award-winning visual effects supervisor
- Cam McHarg, actor and film director
- Robert A. Nakamura, film director, co-founder of Visual Communications, teacher
- John Pomeroy, animator
- Alex Ranarivelo, film director
- Brooke Roberts, director
- Matthew Rolston, photographer and director
- Dan Santat, author, illustrator, creator of Disney's The Replacements
- Tarsem Singh, film director
- Zack Snyder, film director and writer
- Jefferson Stein, film director
- Bruce Surtees, cinematographer
- Mark Whiting, writer and director; production designer with Warner Bros., The Iron Giant

=== Fine Art and Graduate Art ===
- Doug Aitken, multimedia artist
- Lynn Aldrich, sculptor
- Edgar Arceneaux, artist
- Carol Bennett, painter and glass artist
- Bob & Bob, performance art duo
- Clayton Brothers, painter
- Lawrence Carroll, painter
- Tom Christopher, painter
- Lindsay Dawson, painter
- Eyvind Earle, fine art painter
- Hedi El Kholti, fine artist, writer and editor
- Zhenya Gershman, painter and portraitist
- Michael Godard, artist
- James Gurney, illustrator and painter
- Frank Hagel, painter and sculptor
- Emilie Halpern, multimedia artist
- Thomas Kinkade, painter of light
- Melissa Kretschmer, contemporary artist
- Sharon Lockhart, contemporary artist
- Richard MacDonald, sculptor
- Patrick Martinez, multimedia artist
- Rebeca Méndez, multimedia artist
- Craig Mullins, concept artist and painter
- Jorge Pardo, contemporary artist
- Bob Peak, illustrator
- Sterling Ruby, artist
- Mark Ryden, fine art painter
- Stan Sakai, comic book artist
- Kevin A. Short, fine art painter
- Ken Shutt, sculptor
- Gordon Smedt, Pop Art painter
- Jennifer Steinkamp, installation artist
- Hiroshi Sugimoto, fine art photographer and architect
- Mark Tansey, artist and painter
- Diana Thater, artist
- Shirley Tse, artist
- Richard Wagener, fine press printer, publisher, engraver
- Nina Waisman, new media artist, sculpture, sound, architecture, and performance
- Casey Weldon, painter
- Jack Wemp, fine art painter
- Jennifer West, fine artist using digitized film
- Pae White, fine art painter
- Charles Wysocki, painter

=== Graphic Design ===
- Stefan G. Bucher, graphic designer
- John Casado, graphic designer and photographer
- Louis Danziger, graphic designer
- Jesse Genet, graphic designer and businessperson
- Joe Hahn, DJ for Linkin Park
- Kit Hinrichs, graphic designer
- Teddy Lo, Hong Kong-based LED artist
- Alvin Lustig, graphic designer
- Rebeca Mendez, graphic designer
- Clement Mok, graphic designer
- Mike Shinoda, MC and multi-instrumentalist for Linkin Park
- Yu Tsai, fashion photographer
- John Van Hamersveld, graphic designer known for iconic The Endless Summer poster
- Duy Dao, creative director and designer, first Vietnamese national nominated for a Grammy

=== Illustration ===
- Chris Appelhans, filmmaker and illustrator
- Peter Brown, illustrator
- Justin Bua, illustrator and art teacher at the University of Southern California
- Marc Burckhardt, illustrator
- Matt Busch, illustrator, filmmaker, professor
- Ricardo Delgado, comic book artist
- Marla Frazee, illustrator
- Grace Lynne Haynes, illustrator
- Philip Hays, illustrator
- Gerard Huerta, illustrator
- Bob Jones, illustrator
- Rafael López, illustrator and artist
- Richard MacDonald, figurative sculptor
- Matt Mahurin, illustrator, photographer and film director
- Mick McGinty, illustrator, fine artist
- Tara McPherson, illustrator, fine artist
- Floyd Norman, animator
- John Parra, illustrator
- LeUyen Pham, illustrator
- Robert Quackenbush, illustrator
- Walter Rane, illustrator and painter
- Marc Remus, illustrator
- Dan Santat, illustrator
- Alex Schaefer, painter and activist
- Lane Smith, illustrator
- Barron Storey, illustrator
- Drew Struzan, illustrator
- Ray Turner, painter
- Michael Whelan, artist of imaginative realism

=== Photography and Imaging ===
- Peter Anderson, cinematographer and visual effects supervisor
- Fred R. Archer
- Sid Avery, Hollywood photographer
- Andrew D. Bernstein, official photographer of the NBA
- Mauren Brodbeck, Swiss artist
- Howell Conant, fashion photographer associated with Grace Kelly
- Barbara DuMetz, photographer
- Lee Friedlander, photographer
- Ron Galella, paparazzo photographer
- Fred Lyon (1924–2022), photographer, attended but did not graduate
- Norman Mauskopf
- Melodie McDaniel
- Dewey Nicks, fashion photographer
- Greg Preston
- Marcia Reed, movie stills photographer
- Co Rentmeester
- Matthew Rolston
- Suza Scalora
- Hiroshi Sugimoto, fine artist, photographer and architect
- Charlie White
- Penny Wolin
- Russel Wong

=== Product Design ===
- Yves Béhar, founder of fuseproject
- Lauri Carleton, designer
- Kenji Ekuan, industrial designer, best known for creating the design of the Kikkoman soy sauce bottle
- Frank Nuovo, chief of design at Nokia
- Satyendra Pakhale, designer
- Gabriela Hernandez, founder of Bésame Cosmetics

=== Spatial Experience Design and Graduate Spatial Experience Design (formerly Environmental Design) ===
- Ini Archibong, artist and designer
- Bruce Burdick, designer
- Nolen Niu, industrial designer

=== Transportation Design ===
- Chris Bangle, former chief of design at BMW
- Harald Belker, automobile designer, designed vehicles for Batman & Robin and Minority Report
- Gordon Buehrig, automobile designer
- Jason Castriota, automobile designer
- Wayne Cherry, former vice president of global design at General Motors
- Dilip Chhabria, Indian automotive designer
- Michelle Christensen, automobile designer, best known as lead designer of the second generation Acura NSX
- John Chun, automotive designer
- Willie G. Davidson, vice president of styling at Harley-Davidson
- Peter Barrett Davis, automotive designer
- Luc Donckerwolke, automotive designer
- Henrik Fisker, automotive designer
- Chip Foose, automotive designer
- Miguel Angel Galluzzi, chief designer of Piaggio Group, designer of the Ducati Monster
- Greg M. Greeson, automotive designer with Opel, VW, IAD, GRIDdesign
- Jon Ikeda, automobile designer, vice president and brand officer of Acura
- Derek Jenkins, automobile designer, vice president of design of Lucid Motors
- Richard Kim, automotive designer
- Emeline King, automotive designer at Ford Motor Company
- SangYup Lee, automotive designer
- Géza Lóczi, director of design at Volvo Monitoring Concept Center
- J Mays, automotive designer
- Shiro Nakamura, automotive designer, served as senior vice president of Nissan Motor Co. Ltd.
- Ken Okuyama, automotive and vehicle designer
- Norbert Ostrowski, automobile designer
- Charles Pelly, industrial designer; founder of DesignworksUSA
- Nick Pugh, automotive designer, artist
- Larry Shinoda, automotive designer, best known for his work on the Chevrolet Corvette and Ford Mustang
- Frank Stephenson, award-winning automobile designer, best known for his design of the Mini Hatch, and design work at Fiat, Alfa Romeo, Ferrari and McLaren
- Dick Teague, vice president of design, American Motors Corporation
- Jeff Teague, automotive designer
- Jack Telnack, former vice president of global design of the Ford Motor Company
- Freeman Thomas, automobile designer
- Franz von Holzhausen, automotive designer with Tesla Motors
- Gerald Wiegert, automobile designer, founder of Vector

=== Graduate Industrial Design ===
- Satyendra Pakhale, industrial designer
- David Stollery, actor and industrial designer

== Faculty ==
- Ansel Adams
- Lita Albuquerque
- Jacki Apple
- Affonso Beato
- Edward Biberman
- Bruce Burdick
- Allen Daviau
- Stan Douglas
- Craig Elliott
- James Fee
- Paul Frank
- Amy Gerstler
- Jeremy Gilbert-Rolfe
- Peter Gould, Breaking Bad and Better Call Saul
- Garnet Hertz
- Burne Hogarth
- Paul Jasmin
- Mike Kelley
- John La Gatta
- Ross LaManna
- Pete MacArthur
- Norman Mauskopf
- Rebeca Mendez
- Ken Okuyama
- Laura Owens
- Bob Peterson
- Stephen Prina
- Matthew Rolston
- Ian Stendal
- Diana Thater
- Mayo Thompson
- Lynda Weinman
- Kent Williams
- Penny Wolin
- Doyald Young
