= Stendal (disambiguation) =

Stendal is a town in Saxony-Anhalt, Germany.

Stendal may also refer to:

- Stendal, Indiana, a town in the U.S.
- Stendal (district), a district in Saxony-Anhalt, Germany, containing the town
- Kurt Stendal (1951–2019), a Danish footballer
- Ian Stendal (1913–1992), photographer
- Trude Stendal (born 1963), Norwegian footballer

== See also ==
- Stendhal, a 19th-century French writer
