= Derby Museum =

Derby Museum may refer to:

- Derby Museum and Art Gallery, Art gallery and museum in Derby, England
- Kentucky Derby Museum
- World Museum Liverpool (founded as Derby Museum)
