= Gordon Smedt =

American painter

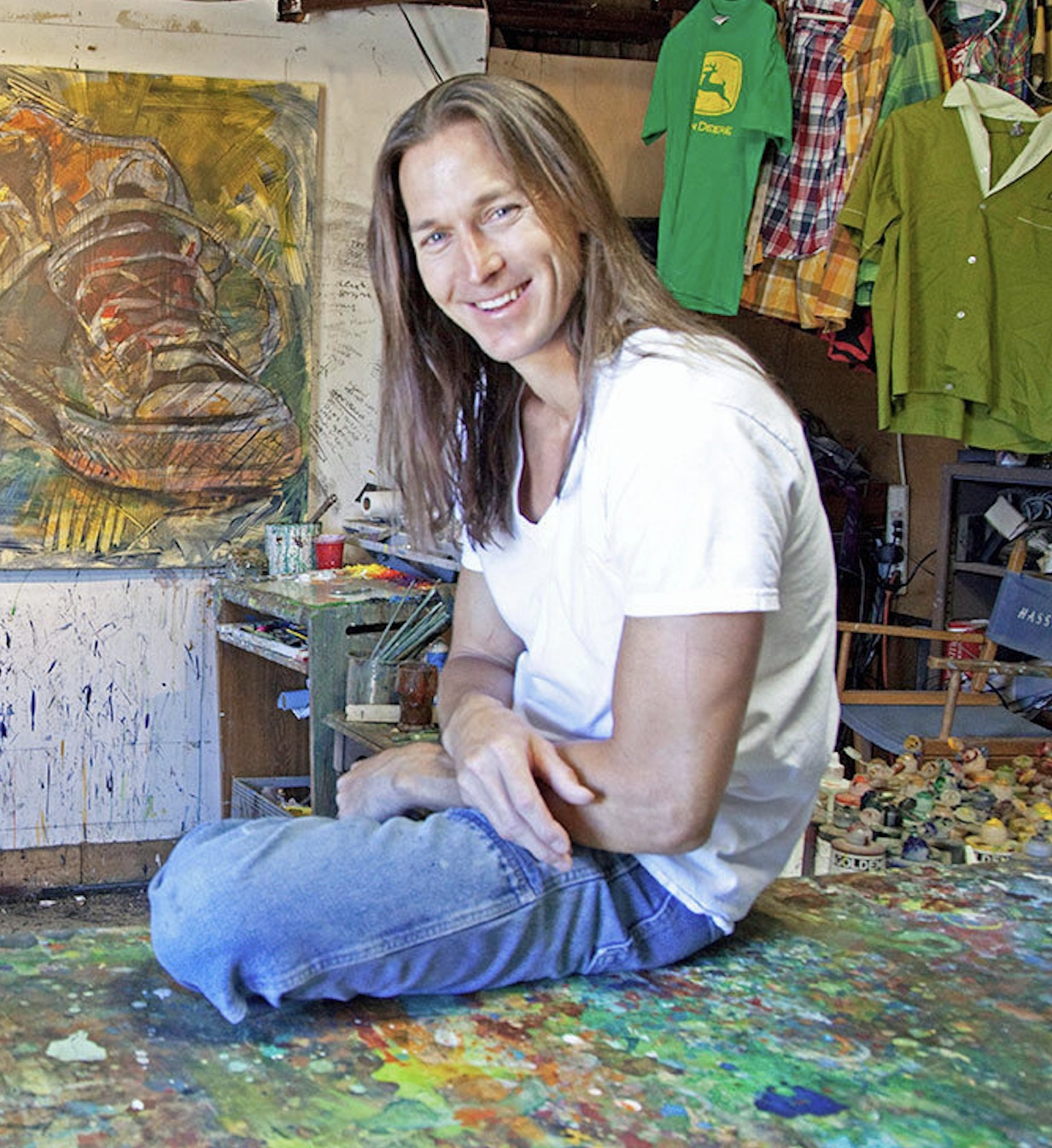
- Artist Gordon Smedt in studio 2012
- Born: Gordon Keith Smedt; August 7, 1961 (age 64); San Francisco, California, United States
- Education: Art Center College of Design, San Jose State University
- Movement: Pop art
- Spouse: Suzanne Whitney-Smedt

Gordon Keith Smedt (born August 7, 1961) is an American painter from the San Francisco Bay Area. Smedt is known for his Pop art portraits of inanimate objects. His work is characterized by bold, colorful depictions of everyday objects on large canvases. He lives and works in Los Gatos, California.

== Early life and education ==
Smedt was born August 7, 1961, in San Francisco, California. He studied Graphic Design and Illustration at San José State University (SJSU) from 1982 to 1984. He attended Art Center College of Design in Pasadena, California from 1985 to 1987, and graduated with a bachelor of fine arts degree in Illustration in 1987.

== Work ==
Smedt's subject matter depicts American heritage. Often painting familiar and everyday objects, Smedt's use of shadows, light, and composition animate his large canvases. His painting style developed from traditional impressionism, but is influenced by modern Pop art.

Smedt's paintings have been exhibited in contemporary art galleries and museums since 1989. Notable galleries include Gallery 30, Tercera Gallery in San Francisco, Steel Gallery, San Jose Museum of Art, San Francisco Fine Art Fair 2011, Andrea Schwartz Gallery, Triton Museum of Art, JCO'S Place for Fine Art, Vault Gallery, Peninsula Museum of Art, and Whitney Modern Contemporary Fine Art. In 2019, Smedt donated a painting to the permanent collection at the New Museum Los Gatos (NUMU).

Collectors include venture capitalists and technology executives of the Silicon Valley, California, and author Danielle Steel.

Smedt collaborated with his wife, gallery director Suzanne Whitney-Smedt, to open Whitney Modern Contemporary Fine Art gallery, which launched in Los Gatos, California in September 2016.
