= Satyendra Pakhalé =

Designer (born 1967)

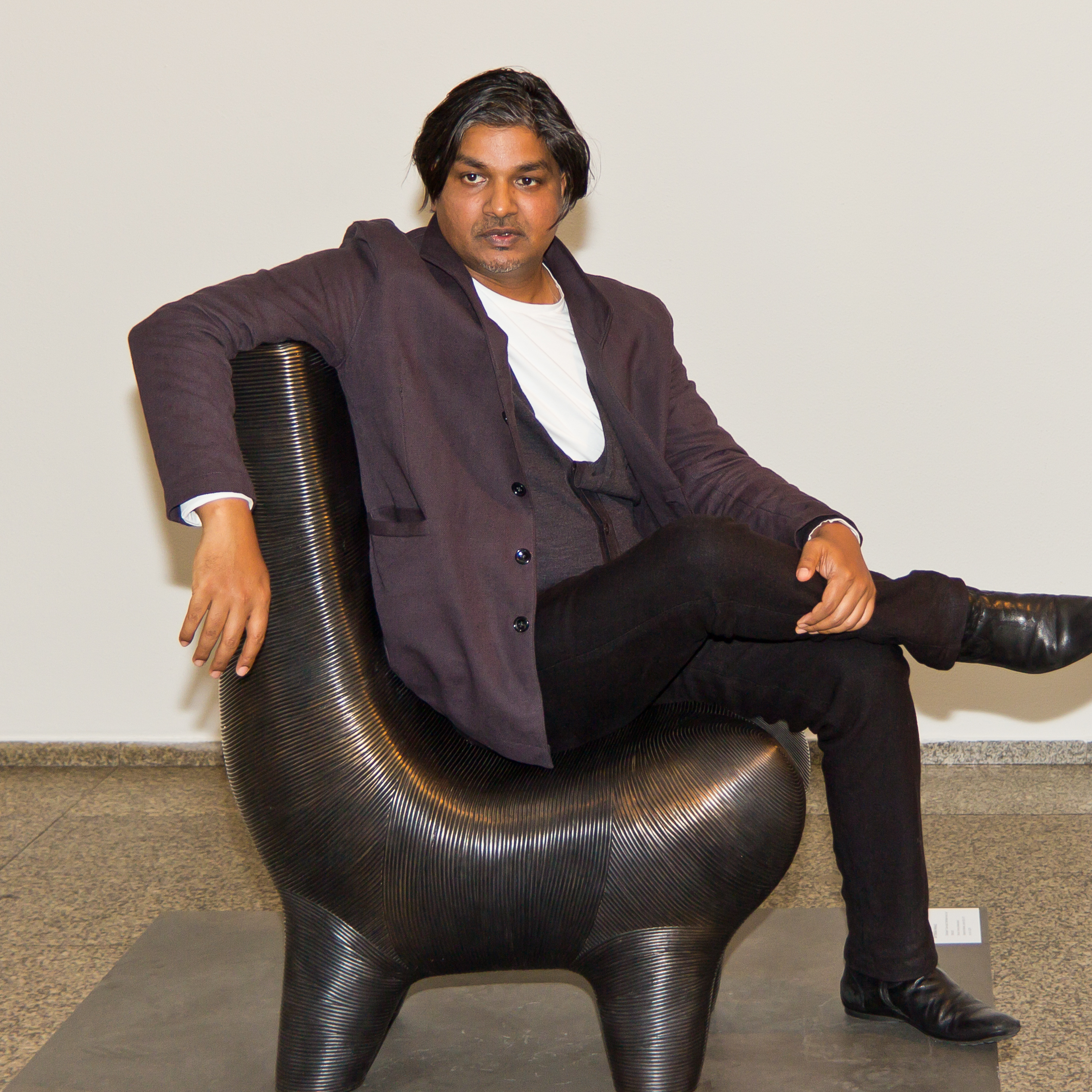
- Pakhalé on a B.M. Horse Stool (2012)
- Born: 20 December 1967 (age 58); Maharashtra, India
- Education: Art Center College of Design (Europe), Switzerland; IDC School of Design IIT-B Indian Institute of Technology Bombay, India
- Occupation: Multifaceted Designer
- Known for: Poetics in Design, Art, Industrial design, Architecture
- Website: satyendra-pakhale.com

Satyendra Pakhalé (born 20 December 1967) is a designer whose work includes industrial design, architecture, furniture, interior design, as well as projects in healthcare and technology. His work is informed by social, cultural, and technological research.

== Biography ==
=== Early life ===
Pakhalé was born and raised in Washim in central Maharashtra, India. From an early age, he showed an interest in drawing, painting, physics, and mechanics. Encouraged by his parents, he began making objects himself. In an interview, he recalled that during his childhood in India, many things were not industrially manufactured, which led him to create his own toys and other objects for personal use from available materials. He has cited the Ajanta Caves as an important influence during his youth.

=== Education ===
Pakhalé's decision to pursue a career in design was influenced by discovering a book by George Nelson, which he found in his school library. He studied engineering in Nagpur (1985–1989) industrial design in Bombay (1989–1991) at the IDC School of Design at the Indian Institute of Technology (IIT) Bombay, and product design at the Art Center College of Design in Switzerland (1992–1994). During his studies, he was taught by designers including Wolfgang Joensson (Frog design) and Simon Fraser (Porsche Design).

== Career ==
After graduating, Pakhalé worked at Frog Design and Philips Design. From 1995 to 1998 he served as Senior Product Designer in the New Business Creation department at Philips Design under the creative leadership of Stafano Marzano, where he worked on a concept car, Pangéa, developed in collaboration between Philips and Renault. He also contributed to design concepts in digital communication, healthcare, and mobility.

In 1998, he founded the Amsterdam-based design practice Satyendra Pakhalé Associates (SPA). Since then, he has collaborated with companies including Poltrona Frau, Novartis, Cappellini, Hästens, and TOD's.

=== Academic work and recognition ===
Pakhalé has lectured at universities and presented his work at conferences, including CeBIT (Germany) and Design Indaba. From 2006 to 2010, he served as the founding dean of the Master of Design for Humanity and Sustainable Living (later renamed Social Design) at the Design Academy Eindhoven.

His works has been exhibited at venues including Ammann Gallery in Cologne. Designs by Pakhalé are held in the permanent collections of institutions, such as the Victoria and Albert Museum, the Stedelijk Museum, the Montreal Museum of Fine Arts, and the Centre Pompidou. Pakhalé has received, among others, several awards and recognition:

- His work was recognised among new and innovative designs in New Notable Product Design II (1995)
- L'Uomo Vogue included him among a list of 80 creative figures in art, design and architecture (2008)
- The Fish Chair was featured at the "Design at Fairchild" exhibition during Miami Art Week, held at Fairchild Tropical Botanic Garden (2014)
- Green Good Design Award for the Grip vase (OFFECCT O2ASIS Collection) from the European Centre for Architecture Art Design Studies and The Chicago Athenaeum Museum of Architecture and Design, Chicago, USA (2016)
- Red Dot Design Award for the Assaya armchair from Red Dot GmbH & Co. KG, Essen, Germany (2016)

== Design ==
=== Philosophy ===
Pakhalé work is rooted in culture of making and engages with themes including poetic analogy, atmosphere, social modernity, secular humanism, craftsmanship, and technology. From mass-produced industrial products to experimental one-offs, art, and architecture; Pakhale aims to return objects and their environment the sensorial qualities that have often been lost due to the excesses of industrialization and consumerism.

Culture of Creation is an active studio practice and applied research platform co-founded in 2013 by designer Satyendra Pakhalé and architect Dr. Tiziana Proietti. The initiative integrates theoretical inquiry with practical exploration, focusing on the fundamental human impulse to create, design, and build.

The concept of a 'culture of creation' articulates a critical reimagining of the world as an ethical, cohesive, sensorial and culturally embedded human making, encompassing the universal need to transform ideas into tangible reality. Rooted in both historical traditions and contemporary practice, it examines the essence of creativity as a defining aspect of human experience and cultural expression.

=== Approach ===
Pakhalé's designs can be described through multiple approaches. Design as an act of unit emphasizes a "middle path", balancing conventional binaries and boundaries, bringing together apparent opposites. These extremes like luxury and poverty or tradition and modernity act as lenses which people assign value. Design and pluralism reflects Pakhalé's prominent connection to universal cultural heritage, prominent in his work. This is achieved by drawing from diverse cultural roots and narratives, he creates contemporary objects and architectural spaces with a strong sense of social and cultural responsibility and multidisciplinary polymathic practices into his works. Design for sensorial beings describes human beings and inherently sensorial entities, with six primary senses. Sensory experience underlines Pakhalé's design philosophy, not only creating visual order and aesthetically interesting objects but creating frameworks that add meaning to his work.

== Notable works ==
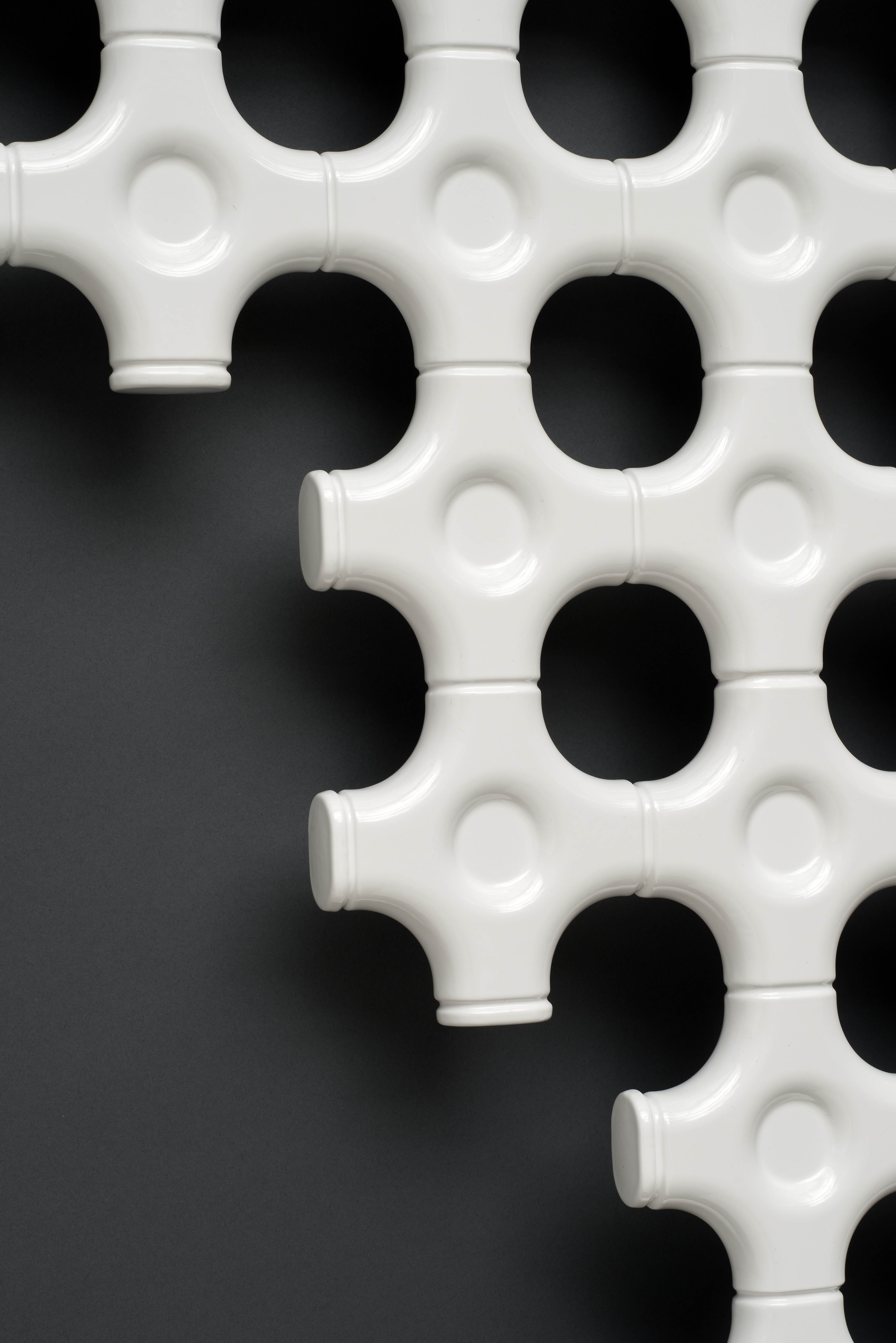
Add-On radiator at the Montreal Museum of Fine Art

=== Architectural design ===
- Lab of the Future, Virchow 16, Novartis Campus, Basel, Switzerland
- Dr. B.R. Ambedkar National Centre for Social Justice, New Delhi, India
- Dr. B.R. Ambedkar National Memorial, New Delhi, India

=== Industrial design ===
- Add-On Radiator
- TBI D02-3000 Implant System
- MeWa System
- Fish Chair
- Akasma Centrepiece
- Kalpa

=== Edition pieces ===
- B.M. Objects Third Generation
- B.M. Horse
- Black and White Swan
- Panther
- KUBU
- Flower Offering Chair

=== Exhibition design ===
- In Progress: design looks to the future (2010), CID Grand-Hornu, Boussu, Belgium
- Bombay Maximum City (2006), Lille3000, Lille, France
- We can't afford to buy CHEAP things. Personal Shopper (2007), Messe Frankfurt, Ambiente Frankfurt Fair, Germany

== Permanent collections ==
Institute	Collection	Year
Museum of Modern Art	B.M. Horse	2025
Victoria and Albert Museum	B.M. Horse Stool	2008
Centre Pompidou	Radiateur Add-On	2003
Centre Pompidou	Siège Multichair PANTHER	2003
Stedelijk Museum	Magis Desk Mat (prototype)	2000
Stedelijk Museum	Akasma 1	2002
Stedelijk Museum	Akasma 2	2002
Stedelijk Museum	Akasma 3	2002
Stedelijk Museum	Bird Chaise Longue	2002
Stedelijk Museum	Kalpa	2002
Stedelijk Museum	LAGORI Post-Computer Game (prototype)	2002
Stedelijk Museum	Satyendra Pakhalé Cultural Nomad. From Projects to Products / Dal progetto al prodotto (book)	2002
Stedelijk Museum	Satyendra Pakhalé from project to products (poster)	2002
M+	RCCC/Roll Carbon Ceramic Chair	2008
MAKK	B.M. Horse	2007
Montreal Museum of Fine Arts	Akasma Baskets	2002
Montreal Museum of Fine Arts	add-On Radiator	2004
Montreal Museum of Fine Arts	Vase and Fruit Basket, B.M. (Bell Metal)	2001
Die Neue Sammlung	Stuhl Flower Offering Chair	2006
Fonds National d'Art Contemporain, Collection of Centre national des arts plastiques	Corbeille Akasma 1	2002
Fonds National d'Art Contemporain, Collection of Centre national des arts plastiques	Plateau Akasma 2	2002
Fonds National d'Art Contemporain, Collection of Centre national des arts plastiques	Plateau Akasma 3	2002
Museum het Kruithuis, 's-Hertogenbosch, The Netherlands	Clay & beyond: Gijs Bakker, Konstantin Grcic, Richard Hutten, Ross Lovegrove, Alberto Meda, Satyendra Pakhalé by Paola Antonelli & Yvònne Joris (book)	2002
Musée départemental d'art contemporain de la Haut-Vienne, Rochechouart, France	Vase Kalpa	2002
SaloneSatellite Permanent Collection	Fish Chair,	2005
SaloneSatellite Permanent Collection	Kayo	2015

== Exhibitions ==
=== Solo exhibitions ===
- Work 'n' Play (2001), SaloneSatellite, Milan, Italy
- From Projects to Products Satyendra Pakhalé (2002), curator Ingeborg de Roode, Stedelijk Museum, Amsterdam, The Netherlands
- Satyendra Pakhalé Design by Heart (2003), Curator Paola Antonelli, OTTO Gallery, Bologna, Italy
- un:Usual (2003), C/O Glamour Design Store, Corso Indipendenza 16, Milan, Italy
- Satyendra Pakhalé – three projects (2005), Future Design Days, Stockholm, Sweden
- Satyendra Pakhalé – Selected design works (2007), Design Boost, Stockholm, Sweden
- We can't afford to buy CHEAP things. Personal Shopper (2007), Messe Frankfurt, Ambiente Frankfurt Fair, Germany
- OriginS (2008), Curator Gabrielle Ammann, ammann // gallery, Cologne, Germany
- Satyendra Pakhalé – Architecture & Design (2009), MIPIM Le marché international des professionnels de l’immobilier, Cannes, France
- Design Lounge (2009), ammann // gallery, Cologne Fine Art & Antiques, Cologne, Germany
- Meeting of Minds (2010), Hästens Flagship, Stockholm, Sweden
- Design at Fairchild (2014), curators Cristina Grajales, Gabrielle Ammann, Nannett Zapata, Design Miami, Fairchild Tropical Botanic Garden, Miami, Florida

=== Group exhibitions (selection) ===
- 1997 – Pangéa Concept Car, Geneva International Motor Show, Switzerland
- 1998 – Vision on move, Evoluon Philips, Eindhoven, the Netherlands
- 1999
  - Beyond European Design, Abitare il Tempo, Verona, Italy
  - Young designers in Milano, Alterpoint Milano, Italy
- 2000 – Design works, group exhibition, Gallery Arte e Industria, Parma, Italy
- 2001 – World Wide Design, Atelier Renault, Paris, France
- 2002 – Panther Off-Scale – 50 Projects, Moroso Golden Jubilee, Milan, Italy
- 2005 – Ole Palsby Retrospective, The Danish Museum of Art and Design, Copenhagen, Denmark
- 2006 – Bamboo architectural elements, Transformation: Nature & Beyond, Material ConneXion Flagship, New York, USA
- 2008 – Urban Compatibility Iittala, Design Boost, Malmö, Sweden
- 2009 – The Clue Design, Gwanju Design Biennale, South Korea
- 2010
  - 10 Years of Via Milano, Oude Kerk Amsterdam, the Netherlands
  - In Progress, CID Grand-Hornu, Belgium
- 2011
  - Daily Future, Moon Life Concept Store, Moon Life Foundation, Amsterdam, the Netherlands
  - Can you imagine? Alcantara, power of a material, MAXXI, Rome, Italy
- 2012
  - International Design for Children, The Dowse Art Museum, Lower Hutt, New Zealand
  - Design & Technology - 15th Anniversary SaloneSatellite, Milan Design Week, Italy
- 2013
  - Outset Design Fund, Victoria & Albert Museum, London, England
  - Meet Design Around the World, Triennale di Milano, Italy
- 2014
  - Modular system - Add-On Radiator, Paris Designer's Days, France
  - 100% Tobeus: 100 Designers for 100 New Toy Cars, Canada National Design Museum, Toronto, Canada
  - Cappellini 2000-2012, ICFF New York, USA
  - Industry City, New York, USA
  - Tom Vack. Vanity of Object, Die Neue Sammlung, Munich, Germany
  - Modularity - Add-On Radiator, Malta Design Week, Fort St. Elmo, Valletta, Malta
- 2015
  - Looking ahead. 9 stories from Veneto: digital – not only digital, Venice Art Biennale, Italy
  - Das Bauhaus #itsalldesign, Vitra Design Museum, Weil am Rhein, Germany
  - Wirkkala Revisited, Design Museum Helsinki, Finland
  - Alessi IN-possible, Design Museum Holon, Israel
- 2016
  - Time Space Existence, Venice Architecture Biennale, Global Art Affairs, Palazzo Michiel, Venice, Italy
  - Houselife, Museum of Decorative Arts and Design, Bordeaux, France
- 2017
  - Ceci n’est pas une copie, Centre d’innovation et de design, Grand-Hornu, Belgium
  - Alessi IN-possible, Triennale di Milano, Italy
  - SaloneSatellite. 20 Years of New Creativity, Fabbrica del Vapore, Milan, Italy
  - Ghost Memory – what a joy! 30° Ghost Anniversary, Milan Fair, Italy
  - The value of design, Red Dot awarded products, Cité du Design, Saint-Étienne, France
- 2018 – Made in Holland: 400 years a global brand, Princessehof Ceramics Museum Leeuwarden, the Netherlands
- 2022 – Design+Health - Diseño+Salud, curator Ramón Úbeda, World Design Capital, Valencia, Spain

== Publications ==
- Cultural Nomad: From Project to Products – Dal progetto al pradotto (2002) ISBN 978-88-7419-002-7
- Culture of Creation (2019) ISBN 978-94-6208-514-5 Contributing authors: Alberto Alessi, Juhani Pallasmaa, Paola Antonelli, Jacques Barsac, Giulio Cappellini, Aric Chen, Cristiano Crosetta, Ingeborg de Roode, Rene Spitz, TizianaProietti, Walter Spink, Vittorio Livi, Marva Griffin, and Stefano Marzano

== See also ==
- List of people from Amsterdam
- List of Dutch people
- Sustainable design
- List of ArtCenter College of Design people
- Design and Technology
