= Gallery 30 =

Coordinates: 39.831212°N 77.229955°W

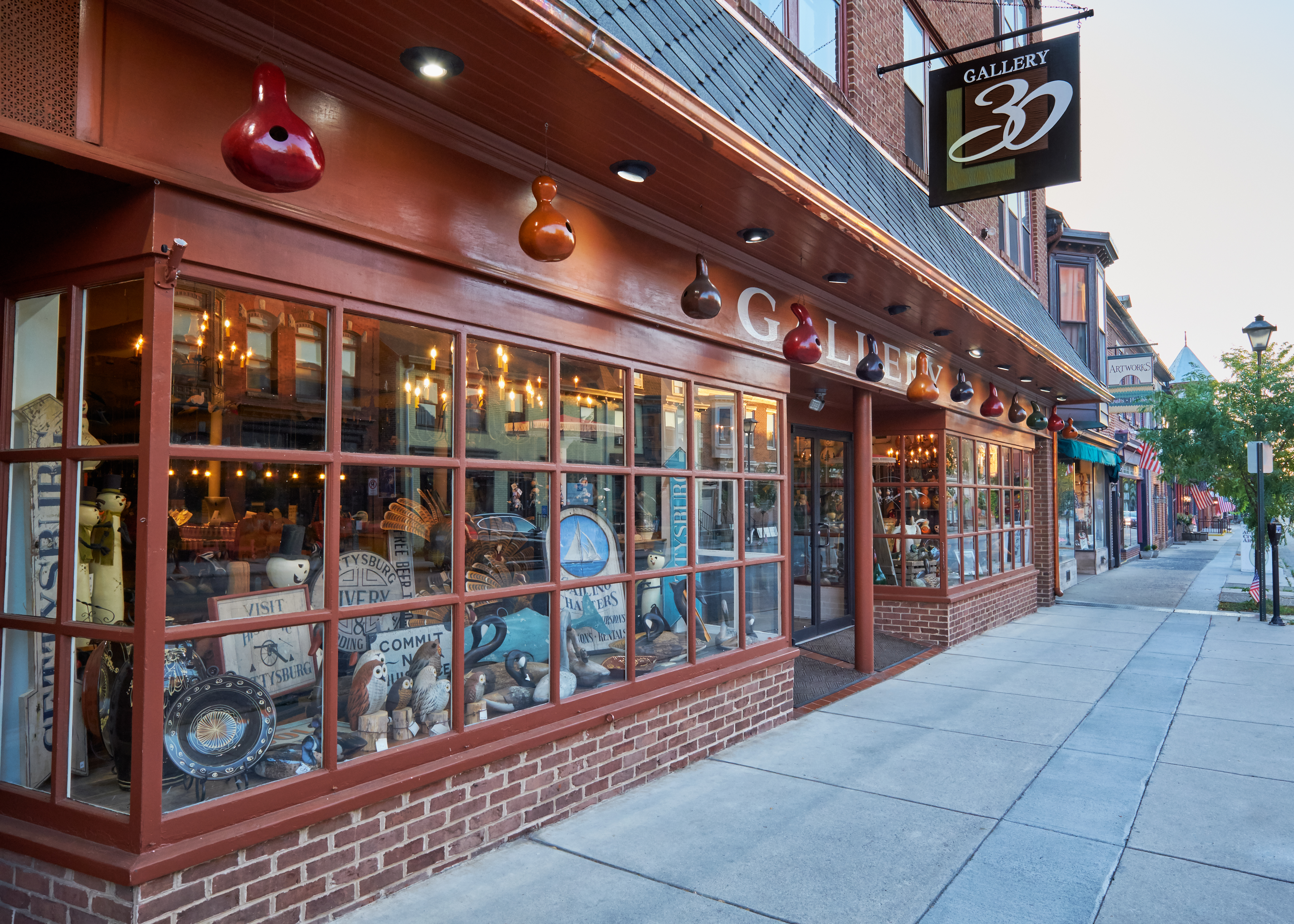
Street View of Gallery 30 in Gettysburg

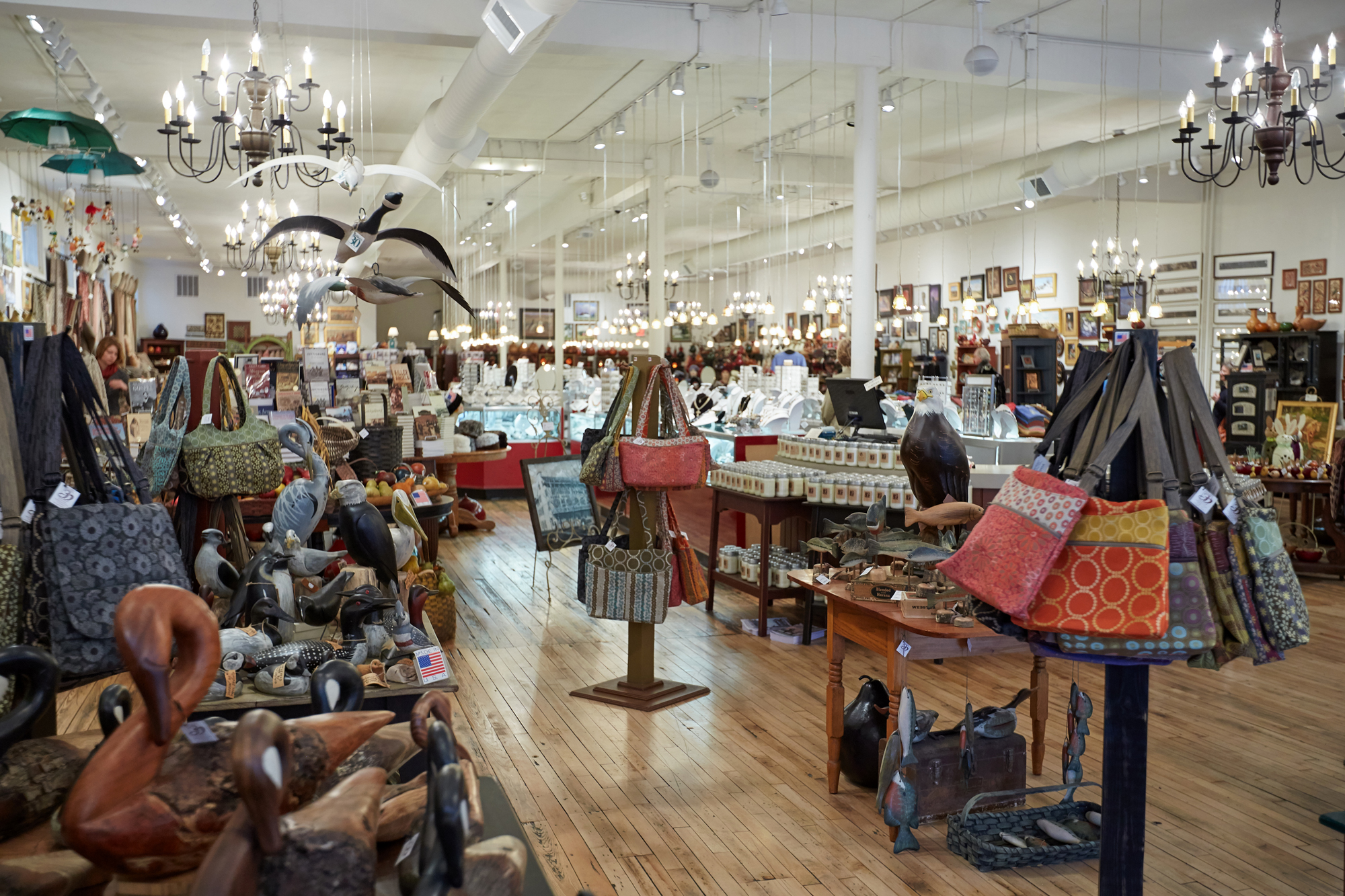
An interior photograph of Gallery 30 in Gettysburg, Pennsylvania

Gallery 30 is an American fine art and craft gallery located in Gettysburg, Pennsylvania, United States. Gallery 30 has occupied two historic buildings in downtown Gettysburg, and its ownership has been active in the local community since the gallery's opening in 1979. Gallery 30 specializes in American fine art and artisan crafts with an emphasis on local and regional art; some of Gallery 30's most notable artists have included Wendy Allen, Janet Walsh and Metro the Painting Racehorse.

== History ==
Gallery 30 opened in October 1979 when watercolorist L. Chris Fick and former Gettysburg College professor Elizabeth “Betty” Martin partnered in a venture that they called a “half bookstore, half gallery.” The women named their business “Gallery 30” in honor of its location at 30 York Street in downtown Gettysburg, Pennsylvania. Gallery 30 opened with a small selection of paintings, photographs and sculptures by local and regional artists and about 4,000 books. The book selection spanned many literary genres but focused primarily on children's literature, reflecting the owners’ appreciation for the art of illustration.

In June 1988, Gallery 30 was acquired by former music teacher and Kansas native Rodney Gisick. Although previous owner Betty Martin continued to be involved with Gallery 30's book department in an advisory capacity, Gisick took Gallery 30's selection in a different direction with the launch of a literary project that he dubbed “Man to Man Books.” By 1992 Gisick had compiled “the largest catalogue of men’s studies books available” in the United States, prompting one publisher to call Gallery 30 “the men’s bookstore for the nation.” During his time as owner, Gisick also made changes to Gallery 30's art department, adding handcrafted gold and sterling silver jewelry and more contemporary artisan crafts.

In May 1993, Gallery 30 and its historic building were purchased by Washington, DC government relations consultants Lois Starkey and Bill Gilmartin. The new owners shifted Gallery 30's primary focus from books back to local and regional art and further diversified the gallery's collection of artisan crafts. Throughout the 1990s, Starkey and Gilmartin also concentrated on deepening the business's roots in the Gettysburg community by regularly hosting book signings, art contests and other family-friendly events.

In August 2007, Gallery 30 and its historic building were acquired by Pennsylvania native Linda Atiyeh. Atiyeh enlarged Gallery 30's selection of Pennsylvania-made artisan crafts, added handcrafted jewelry by both local and international artists and refined Gallery 30's collection of local and regional fine art by placing a greater emphasis on Pennsylvania and Gettysburg-related subject matter. In 2013, Atiyeh expanded Gallery 30 by moving the business to a larger historic building at 26-28 York Street, next door to Gallery 30's original location. In April 2015,

=== Historic architecture ===
==== 30 York Street ====
The historic 19th Century building that originally housed Gallery 30 is located at 30 York Street, also known as US Route 30 and the historic Lincoln Highway, in Gettysburg, Pennsylvania. The brick building bears an official plaque that verifies it as a Civil War building that was standing during the Battle of Gettysburg in 1863. In fact, the building was erected in the early 1800s by Gettysburg merchant John Hoke, the proprietor of a store offering dry goods and groceries. In 1858, J.C. Guinn took over Hoke's Store and continued to operate it “on an enlarged scale.” In 1866, the store changed hands again when it was purchased by J.A. Grimes who called his business a “family grocery and variety store.” Nicholas Codori acquired the building in 1867 and started a butcher shop with his son Simon J. Codori. In 1906, the Codori family abandoned the butchering business in order to open a garage in another York Street building and form the Citizens Oil Company. By the early 1920s, Gettysburg merchant Harry Viener had acquired 30 York Street and was operating a store specializing in ready-made clothing. In 1953, Harry Viener's Store was sold to brothers Martin and Charles Redding and was reopened as Redding's Supply Store. Redding's Supply Store remained in operation until 1979.

In 1979, Chris Fick and Betty Martin acquired the 6,000-square-foot building at 30 York Street and renovations were undertaken in order to create a more light-filled space prior to Gallery 30's opening. Several 6-feet tall by 8-inches wide window panels were added to the east side of the brick building, and the interior was opened up to make way for a shiplap structure to be installed through the center of the space. Gettysburg contractor Robert Crouthamel was hired to construct a small house inside the building to serve as Gallery 30's children's book department. Gallery 30's logo and storefront sign were designed by architect Fred Harle of Mechanicsburg, Pennsylvania; the logo consisted of a white numeral 30 oriented at a 30-degree angle on a green background.

When Lois Starkey and Bill Gilmartin acquired 30 York Street in 1993, they made several architectural changes including enclosing the building's back porch in order to add windows and square footage to Gallery 30's retail gallery space. In 2007, Linda Atiyeh acquired 30 York Street. Atiyeh continued to operate Gallery 30 at its original location, making only minor architectural adjustments to the building's interior.

==== 26-28 York Street ====
In 2012, Linda Atiyeh purchased the 16,400-square-foot building located at 26-28 York Street with plans to relocate and expand Gallery 30. This historic building began life as Walter's Theater; at the turn of the 20th Century entrepreneur John F. Walters, who had had great success with a small “moving picture business” on Baltimore Street in Gettysburg, decided “to erect a larger theater, complete with stage on York Street.” Walter's Theater regularly hosted picture shows, community theater events, singers and traveling vaudeville acts. The theater created a stir in 1910 when it featured a “real burlesque show” called “Monte Carlo Girls” live on its stage. The graduation ceremony for Gettysburg High School's class of 1917 was also held at Walter's Theater, with those in attendance taking special notice of the patriotic decorations hung throughout the auditorium in support of the American troops in World War I. In 1917, Richard H. Humphries of Philadelphia became the manager of Walter's Theater, changing the theater's name to the Lincoln Way Theater.

In 1927, E.L. Weikert acquired the Lincoln Way Theater, remodeled the building into an auto garage and opened a Hudson-Essex dealership called E.L. Weikert Motor Car Company. In 1931, Weikert sold the building to Luther Sachs, who opened Luther I. Sach's Hardware Store. Sach's partnered with the Adams County Market-Growers’ Association in 1935 to create an indoor farmer's market in the rear section of his hardware store; thirty-three individual stalls were rented to local farmers at a rate of $25.00 per year.

In the years that followed, 26–28 York Street was home to a number of different businesses, including H. G. Armistead Five and Ten Store, J. Louis Schultz Insurance and The Blind Center Shop. The Blind Center Shop was opened in 1949 by Cletus A. Wertz, a Gettysburg man who was blinded in an accident “several years” before. The shop carried leather and plastic products, including purses and belts, that were hand-laced and assembled by Wertz, who lived and worked with the assistance of his seeing-eye dog Dolly.

In 1952, Hayward Wogan purchased 26-28 York Street. Wogan redesigned the building, christening it The Peoples Drug Store Building, and opened Peoples Drug Store, a Rexall pharmacy. In the mid-1980s, Hayward Wogan changed his pharmacy's name to Wogan's Drug Store. After Hayward Wogan's death, his sister Catherine Wogan closed the drug store and the space became Wogan's Antique Gallery.

In 2012, Linda Atiyeh acquired the historic property and began extensive renovations, including removing a drop ceiling to uncover original skylights, un-bricking original windows, installing new electrical, heating/cooling and lighting systems, painting and restoring the exterior storefront, and uncovering and restoring the original wood floor using vintage floor planks reclaimed from a historic building in Kentucky. Gallery 30 opened for business in the newly restored building at 26-28 York Street in 2013.

== Community involvement ==
Throughout its history, Gallery 30 has endeavored to give back to the local community in Gettysburg, Pennsylvania. Gallery 30's founders often held book signings, film screenings, slideshows, lectures and art exhibitions that were open to the community free of charge. Under the direction of owner Rod Gisick, Gallery 30 began hosting larger artistic events, including the Annual Loretta Chris Fick Memorial Art Show and Reception and the First Annual Pennsylvania Artisans Show.

In 1993, owners Lois Starkey and Bill Gilmartin instituted a free children's story hour, occasionally featuring readings by local authors, held weekly at Gallery 30. Throughout the 1990s, Gallery 30 supported fledgling community organizations such as Main Street Gettysburg and Gettysburg Area Retail Merchants Association. Gallery 30's ownership was also instrumental in the formation of the Adams County Arts Council and the History Meets the Arts Exhibition, “a multi-faceted cultural event held annually in Gettysburg to showcase our nation’s prominent historical artists in an up-close, personal setting.” Gallery 30 was involved in Downtown Gettysburg's inaugural First Friday event in 2002 and continues to celebrate First Friday to this day with extended hours, featured artists, book signings and refreshments on the first Friday of each month.

== Notable artists ==
Gallery 30 has exhibited American fine art and American craft for over 36 years. Representing over 100 different artists from around the country, Gallery 30 has showcased an extensive collection of both emerging and established artists working in a variety of mediums.

Through the years Gallery 30 has represented hundreds of artists, artisans and authors. In 1979, the gallery opened with the work of two local artists, surrealist painter John Winship and abstract sculptor Alan Paulson. Later, Gallery 30 represented acclaimed artist Wendy Allen; Allen creates Abraham Lincoln portraits using an artistic technique that is a combination of painting and sculpting, molding thick layers of paint with her hands. Allen's work has appeared on dozens of book and magazine covers and has been selected for Abraham Lincoln exhibitions alongside the work of artists such as Salvador Dalí, W.H. Johnson and Norman Rockwell. In the late 2000s, Gallery 30 represented renowned watercolorist Janet Walsh. Walsh served as president of the American Watercolor Society and a Fellow in the Royal Society for the Encouragement of the Arts in London, England; her work has received many accolades including a Metropolitan Museum of Art Award. In 2007, Walsh developed an instructional video series exclusively for Gallery 30 based upon her book “Watercolor Made Easy.”

Today Gallery 30 represents Abraham Lincoln portrait artist Rich Thompson. Thompson's work has been displayed in the Lincoln Collection at the Abraham Lincoln Library and Museum in Springfield, Illinois, the Lincoln Museum in Hodgenville, Kentucky, The Lincoln Library and Museum in Harrogate, Tennessee, as well as Ford's Theatre in Washington DC. Thompson also won visitors’ choice at the Rosenbach Museum in Philadelphia during Lincoln's 200th birthday celebration. Gallery 30 also represents award-winning folk artist Susan Daul. Daul is a master of Pennsylvania German Fraktur art whose work has been displayed in museums throughout the country, including Colonial Williamsburg, The American Folk Art Museum, and the Philadelphia Museum of Art.

Gallery 30's most noted local author is Gabor Boritt Dr. Boritt is the author, co-author or editor of sixteen books, including The Gettysburg Gospel: The Lincoln Speech that Nobody Knows, which was featured on the cover of U.S. News & World Report. Dr. Boritt served as director of The Civil War Institute at Gettysburg College and was instrumental in the establishment of the Lincoln Prize, “widely considered the most coveted award for the study of American history.” In 2008, President George W. Bush awarded Gabor Boritt the National Humanities Medal.

Gallery 30 also represents several well-known artisan jewelry designers, including Rhode Island designer John Medeiros, whose highly detailed, hand-tooled jewelry is known for its classic American style. Gallery 30 also represents Connecticut jewelry designer Michael Michaud. Michaud's true-to-nature botanical jewelry has been commissioned by The Art Institute of Chicago, The National Gallery of Art and The Victoria & Albert Museum.

=== Metro the Painting Racehorse ===
Gallery 30 also represented Metro the Painting Racehorse from 2012 to 2016. Metro Meteor was “once considered one of the fastest sprinters on the east coast, winning eight races and more than $300,000 at Belmont and Saratoga; that is until knee crippling injuries ended his racing career and almost ended his life.” In 2009, Gettysburg artist Ron Krajewski adopted Metro off the track and first gave the horse a paintbrush. Metro started making broad strokes against a canvas, and soon the horse was painting with Krajewski every day. Half of Metro's profits from the sale of each painting are donated to New Vocations Racehorse Adoption Program, “an organization that retrains and finds new homes for retired racehorses.” As of July 2015, Metro had raised over $80,000 for the charity.

== Gallery 30 news coverage ==
In 2013, Gallery 30 was featured in the New York Times article, "36 Hours in Gettysburg.”

New York Daily News also featured Gallery 30 in 2013 article, which noted Gallery 30's long history and emphasis on “handmade in the USA.”

In 2014, Gallery 30 was named the “#1 Place to Shop in Gettysburg” by USA Today's 10 Best.

In 2014, Gallery 30 was included in the Taschen travel book, The New York Times: 36 Hours USA & Canada by Barbara Ireland (Editor); Taschen; 2nd ed. edition (October 25, 2014).
