= Norman Mauskopf =

American documentary photographer (born 1949)

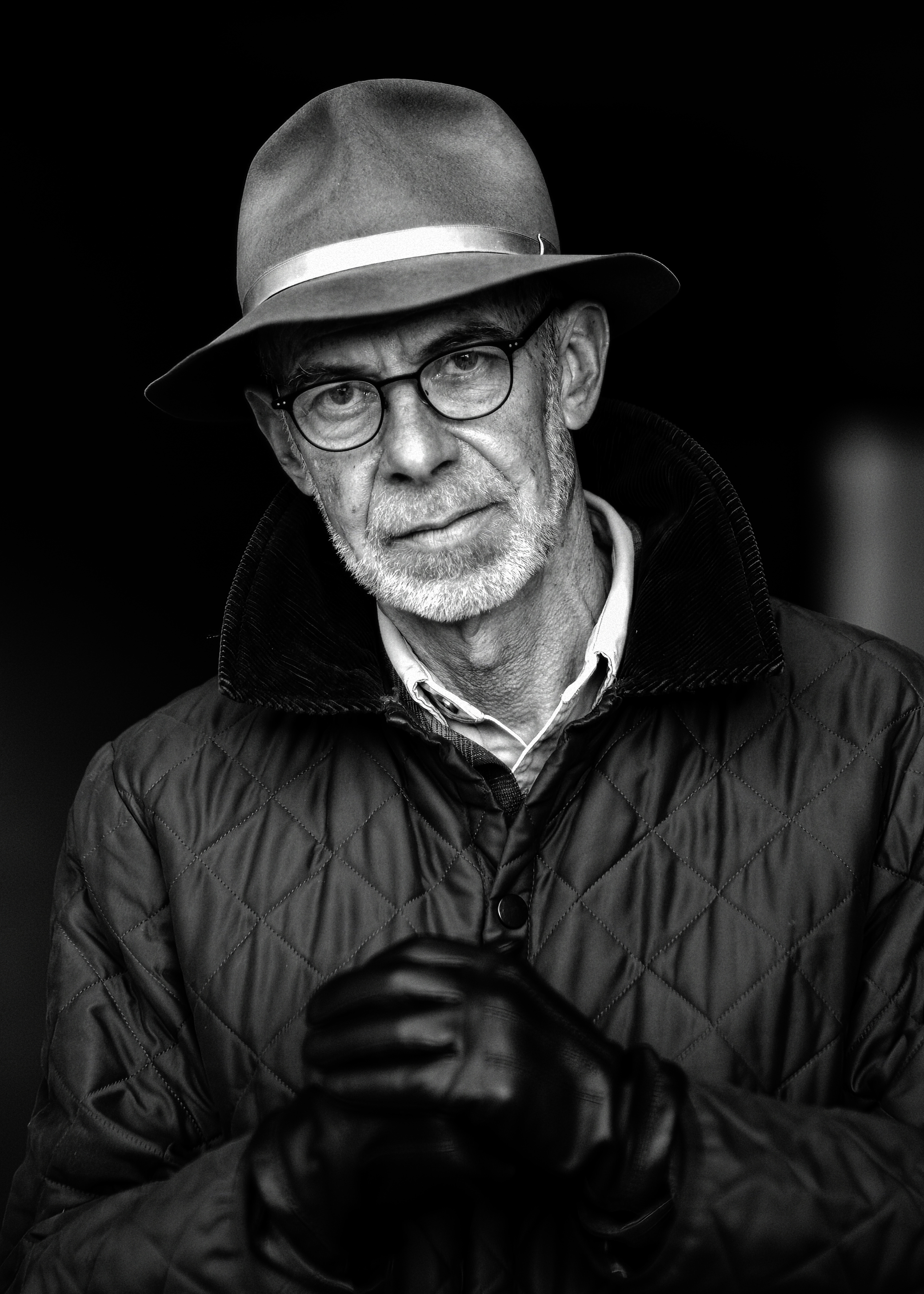
- Mauskopf in 2016
- Born: 1949 (age 76–77); Brooklyn, New York
- Occupation: Photographer
- Website: www.normanmauskopf.com

Norman Mauskopf (born 1949 in Brooklyn, New York) is an American documentary photographer who has published three books. Mauskopf currently resides in Santa Fe, New Mexico.

== Work and career ==
Norman Mauskopf has been a documentary photographer and photographic educator for over 30 years. He was born in Brooklyn, New York in 1949. Mauskopf's parents had fled Czechoslovakia following World War II and settled in New York City in 1947. While living in New York his parents worked in a clothing factory. In 1951 the Mauskopf family relocated to Washington D.C., where they lived above a three-aisle grocery shop his parents owned. His parents operated the store as a family business for 34 years before retiring in 1985. His sister, Roslynn Renee Mauskopf is a United States District Judge serving on the United States District Court for the Eastern District of New York.

He studied and taught photography at Art Center College of Design in Pasadena, California. Norman Mauskopf has also taught at Maine Media Workshops and Santa Fe Photographic Workshops. He has completed assignments for numerous magazines, including Wired, Islands, Travel & Leisure, Outside Magazine, and Rolling Stone. He has had two exhibitions at Visa pour l'Image, the International Festival of Photojournalism in Perpignan, France.

In 2002, Mauskopf was awarded a W. Eugene Smith Fellowship.

Mauskopf's work is currently displayed at the Verve Gallery of Photography in Santa Fe, New Mexico.

== Books ==
Mauskopf has published three award-winning books; a fourth is expected during the second half of 2010. His first book, Rodeo, looked into the lives of professional rodeo cowboys. Author Ben Maddow wrote in the introduction to Rodeo, "they are not merely photographs but observations deeply seen and deeply felt... Mauskopf has uncovered something profound and instinctive." The book was awarded Best of Show by the Art Directors Club of Los Angeles.

The second book, Dark Horses, documents the world of thoroughbred horse racing and was described as "classic photojournalism slyly refracted through prisms of drama, majesty and humor."

The third book, A Time Not Here, documents the musical and spiritual traditions of African Americans in Mississippi. In a review Graphis Inc. writes: "In his landmark documentation of the region, chronicled in "A Time Not Here", Norman Mauskopf captures it all. In stark, high-contrast black-and-white photos, the viewer strolls into Po’ Monkey’s Lounge for a cold beer and is then baptized into the murky, cypress tree laden tributaries of the Mississippi River. Mauskopf accurately depicts a region whose clock has stopped mid 20th century, but somehow maintains everything else which is truly important. The book, first released in 1997, is a monumental achievement, and Graphis heralds it as a book that matters.

A fourth book, Descendants, on northern New Mexico Hispanic culture is scheduled for the second half of 2010. Descendants will feature an original text by poet Jimmy Santiago Baca.

Norman Mauskopf has also completed a rare documentary about the legal brothels of Mustang, Nevada.
