= Marc Remus =

German painter

Marc Remus (born 28 November 1969, in Frankfurt) is a German Neo-pop artist, painter, and illustrator. He works mainly in mixed media, acrylic, watercolor, tea and coffee. Remus is known for his cityscapes and has painted over hundred cities, mainly in Europe and North America.

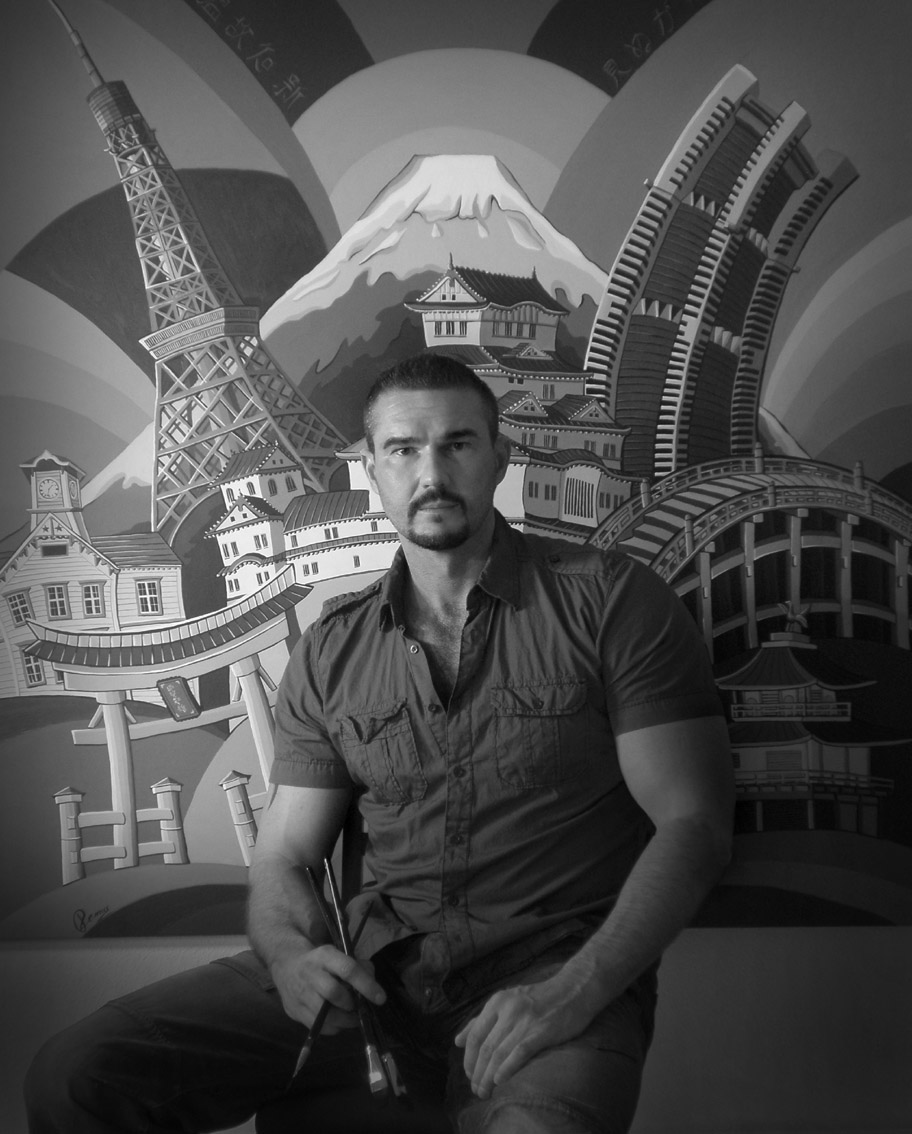
Marc Remus picture

== Biography ==
Marc Remus grew up in Germany. With many relatives living in the North America he moved to the United States early where he graduated from an art high-school. In the early 90s he moved again, this time to Japan where he studied Sumi-E painting and woodblock printing. Upon his return to the United States he was accepted into Art Center College of Design in Pasadena/California. In 1996 he graduated with a degree in art. After having spent some time in Central America he started free-lancing in Europe and the United States. He illustrated various covers for children's magazines (e.g. Cicada magazine).

In 2002 Remus began his first series of cityscapes called Impressions of Cities and Countries. Since then he has painted over 100 images of California, German, and Japanese cities. Many galleries and cities in Germany commissioned Remus to paint their city.

After the diagnosis of cancer in 2006 Remus changed his painting style from more traditional, realistic painting to the colorful, vivid Neo-pop art. Remus began to focus on big cities around the world and named the series Fun Cities.

Remus is expanding the series to countries and has won the battle against the disease.

== Work ==
- Children's Illustrations, Mixed Media (starting in 1998)
- Impressions of Cities and Countries, Watercolors, Acrylics, Tea & Coffee (starting in 2002)
- Fun Cities and Countries, Acrylics (starting in 2006)
- The Red Window, Acrylics (starting in 2010)
