= Frank Nuovo =

Italian-American industrial designer

Frank Nuovo (born 1961), an Italian American, has been a mobile phone industrial designer and a former Vice President and Chief of Design at Nokia.

== Education ==
Nuovo graduated with a bachelor of science in industrial design from the Art Center College of Design in Pasadena in 1986.

== Career ==
Nuovo started his professional industrial design career in 1986, working with Charles Pelly's Designworks. Early projects ranged from furniture to medical instruments and from consumer electronics and transportation interiors to complex air traffic and automated control systems workstation designs. Nuovo's affiliation with Nokia began in 1989 through consultancy while working at Designworks/USA in Agoura. In 1995 he began working for Nokia full-time and he set up Nokia's first dedicated industrial design and styling group center in Los Angeles, California. Over the next decade (1995 to 2006), Nuovo led the creation of Nokia's first global design team, which, during his administration, included additional design centers in Finland and England and also included remote design teams in Denmark, China, Japan, Germany and the USA.

In late 2005, Nuovo began planning to leave his position at Nokia in order to focus on Vertu. Upon his departure from Nokia in April 2006, he maintained a role as Principal Designer at Vertu with a concentration on developing the Vertu brand and product portfolio until his departure from Vertu in 2012.

== Personal life ==
Nuovo opened his own design studio in Southern California called Design Studio Nuovo, which he operates with his designer wife and business partner, Trina Nuovo.
