= Nolen Niu =

American Industrial Designer (born 1975)

- Born: 1975 (age 50–51); United States
- Occupation: Industrial Designer

Nolen Niu (born 1975) is an American Industrial Designer who received his Bachelor of Science in Industrial Design from the Art Center College of Design located in Pasadena, California.

His company, Nolen Niu, Inc., provides services including corporate branding, product design for consumer electronics and furniture. Niu's corporate office is located in Beverly Hills with a studio and showroom located in Hollywood, California.

== Articles ==
- The New York Times
- Apartment Therapy: Los Angeles
- MoCo Loco
- square. Magazine
