= Rebeca Méndez =

Mexican-American artist and graphic designer (born 1962)

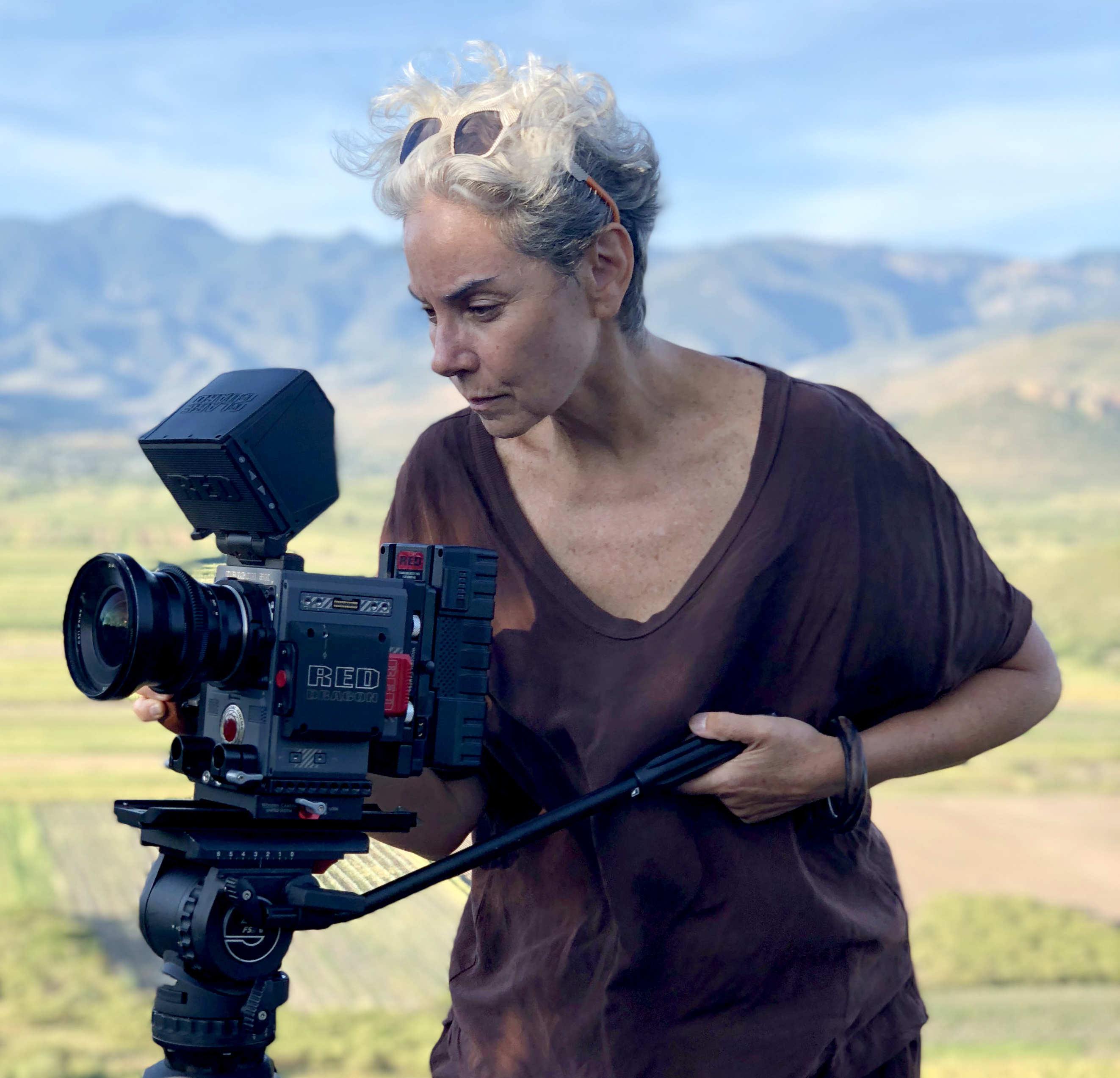
- Rebeca Mendez filming Ascent of Weavers in Oaxaca, 2018
- Born: June 8, 1962 (age 64); Mexico City, Mexico
- Education: Art Center College of Design
- Awards: 2017 Medal of A.I.G.A.
- Website: www.rebecamendez.com

Rebeca Méndez (born June 8, 1962) is a Mexican-American artist, graphic designer and photographer. She is a professor at UCLA Design Media Arts in Los Angeles, California, as well as the founder and director of the Counterforce Lab. She has won the Cooper-Hewitt National Design Award in Communication Design in 2012, the AIGA Medal in 2017, and induction into the One Club Hall of Fame in 2017. Méndez is the only woman ever to have received all three of these awards.

In the biography she wrote when Méndez was awarded the AIGA Medal, Margaret Andersen notes that Méndez has worked across various cultural and professional domains.

== Early life and education ==
Rebeca Méndez was born on June 8, 1962, in Mexico City, Mexico. Her parents were both chemical engineers, whom she always saw investigating, experimenting, and proving their work, which she has credited as inspiring the process for her artistic practice. One of Méndez's first designs was in her parents' home, where they allowed her to paint whatever she desired on the largest wall in their home. At the age of six, Méndez began training as a gymnast; at ten, she joined the Junior National Olympics Gymnastics team, and in 1979 she was the national champion of Mexico and on the team that was going to go to the 1980 Summer Olympics in Moscow. However, when Russia invaded Afghanistan in December 1979, the United States boycotted the Olympics and Mexico did the same, which prevented her from becoming an Olympian. She relocated to the United States at 18 with the support and encouragement of her father and in 1984 received her BFA in Communication Design from ArtCenter College of Design in Pasadena, California. In 1989 she returned to Art Center as Designer of the College, and later its Design Director, a position she held until 1995. Méndez went on to earn her MFA in Media Design Practices from the same college in 1997.

On December 20, 2019, Méndez was bestowed with the honorary degree of Doctor of Fine Arts by her alma mater, ArtCenter College of Design, which honors her as an artist and designer.

== Art and themes ==
Rebeca Méndez's work spans photography, video, 16mm film, typography, cartography, and architecture. Her research examines media representation and cultural expressions of nature through visual and design mediums. Some critics and scholars have noted that her work addresses themes related to gender and social equity, particularly in relation to women's roles in society.

Her art and design work has been exhibited and collected by institutions such as the San Francisco Museum of Modern Art, The Stedelijk Museum in Amsterdam, Jose Luis Cuevas Museum in Mexico City, and the National Design Museum in New York. Her work has been featured in various media such as The Los Angeles Times, The New Yorker and Graphis Magazine.

Méndez is the founder and director of the CounterForce Lab, a research and fieldwork studio that harnesses the power of art and design to engage with the reality of the global ecological crisis and its ties to environmental injustice.

== Career ==
In 1992 the silk-screen poster Exceso de Identidad by Rebeca Méndez was part of an international invitational collection of forty posters commissioned by the second International Biennial of the Poster, held in Mexico City, under the theme "America Now, 500 years later.' Her poster explores identity issues and features her torso which represents the individual in both its strength and its vulnerability. Méndez attempted to dilute the celebration of Columbus's so-called "conquest" of the New World by reducing his ship to a decorative wallpaper element; the faint silhouette of the poodle serves as an example of how species ownership limits, traps and distorts identity.

Since 1996 Méndez has run a private practice with her writer husband Adam Eeuwens. Rebeca Méndez Studio specializes in work with cultural and socially-oriented clients, designing books on Bill Viola for the Whitney Museum and the Deutsche Guggenheim; books with curator Alma Ruiz for MoCA; projects with architects such as Thom Mayne/Morphosis; with the Swedish activist documentary maker Fredrik Gertten and with Danish director Pernille Rose Grønkjær; with director Mike Figgis; visionary Bob Stein; author Ashton Applewhite; design theorist Benjamin H. Bratton, photographer Iwan Baan and musician Ben Frost, among others.

In 1997 Méndez was brought in by Tony Arefin as a freelance art director for Wieden+Kennedy in Portland, Oregon, working on the Microsoft account, including a concept for Microsoft Store. Again introduced by Arefin, in 1999 she began working as the creative director at Ogilvy & Mather in New York, first on the IBM account with Chris Wall, then with Brian Collins at Brand Integration Group (BIG), who then asked her to set up and lead a BIG studio at Ogilvy in Los Angeles, a position she held until 2003. She worked on global brand identity projects for clients such as IBM, The One Club and Mattel.

In 1998 her design work was recognized with the solo exhibition Rebeca Méndez: Selections from the Permanent Collection of Architecture and Design,' at the San Francisco Museum of Modern Art, by Aaron Betsky, curator of Architecture and Design. In his introduction wall text he wrote: "Méndez is both an artist and a graphic designer. She is a master at organizing information into minimal yet clear blocks. What is distinctive about her work is what happens around and underneath this information." The museum collected eight works into its permanent collection.

In 1999 architect Thom Mayne and his office Morphosis commissioned Méndez to create a 25,000 square feet permanent art installation, a mural covering walls and ceilings, in the restaurant Tsunami in Las Vegas. Cooper-Hewitt National Design Museum curator Ellen Lupton showcased the work in the first National Design Triennial in New York in 2000. In the catalogue 'Design Culture Now' she wrote: "Rebeca Méndez enables two-dimensional surfaces to harbor illusions of depth, endowing them with such physical qualities as translucency and tension. From the tidy rectangle of the page to the immersive scenario of an architectural interior, she transforms images from static, self-contained objects to open, flowing fields for visual experience." Méndez credits this collaboration with the moment she felt: "Ah, I'm a fine artist. This is what I want to do. That is really when I began working in parallel as both a designer and as an artist. Prior to that moment, I was very much a designer." Méndez collaborated again with Morphosis in 2004 to create two murals for the student recreation center at the University of Cincinnati, and this work was exhibited at the Centre George Pompidou in Paris, France, as part of a 2006 retrospective of the work of Thom Mayne and Morphosis. This project was the first design to ever receive a Platinum Award at Graphis Magazine. It also received an AIGA 365 Award of Excellence in 2007.

In 1999 Méndez directed and co-wrote the script of the closing scene for Mia Maestro and her character 'Ana Paulis' in Mike Figgis' film Timecode. Holly Willis wrote about this collaboration in the now defunct independent film website ifilm.net: "I simply must have her," says director Mike Figgis speaking with the utter charm that only a British accent affords, and the vehemence allowed only to film directors of note. "She's extraordinary. A poet. I couldn't stop listening to her."

Méndez began teaching as fully tenured professor in the Design Media Arts department for UCLA School of the Arts & Architecture in 2003.

In 2004, Méndez began working with the Los Angeles Commission on Assaults Against Women (LACAAW), whom she guided toward renaming themselves as Peace Over Violence. Her work with the commission has been credited as prompting a 50% increase in donations and earning her the Ideas Over Violence award at the 45th Annual Humanitarian Awards Gala.

In 2004 Méndez was invited to participate in a competition to design the user interface for the Microsoft Home, which she won.

In 2008, Méndez received a commission from the Los Angeles County Arts Commission, to create a permanent public art installation at the LA County Registrar-Recorder County Clerk.

In 2010 Méndez received a Mid-Career Fellowship from the California Community Foundation.

Mendez participated in the first-ever TEDx conference at UCLA in 2011.

In 2013, CircumSolar, Migration 1—a video art installation reflecting on the planet-wide migration of the Arctic tern—premiered at Glow, an all-night arts event on the beach of Santa Monica, California. Shortly after, the Los Angeles County Civic Arts Division commissions her to create the art component for the newly built Pico Rivera Library. This results in "CircumSolar, Migration 2", a 132-foot-long photographic mural printed on canvas running along the library wall, and a 9,000 lbs. Corten steel sculpture, titled Observation Point 1.

The following year she produced "CircumSolar, Migration 4" for the Los Angeles Metro Art Commission at the Crenshaw station on the K-line, which opened October 7, 2022.

In 2017 she received an artist residency at SOMA in Mexico City, where she focused on immigration issues and women's rights. That same year she served as a juror for the Pritzker Emerging Environmental Genius award and served in this capacity again the following year.

In 2018 Méndez was a co-chair for the 2018 National Design Awards.

== Awards ==
- 1996 I.D. Magazine Design Annual, Best in Print for Art Center Catalogue 1995/96
- 1997 Leipzig Book Fair, Bronze medal for Best Book Design from All Over the World for book on Bill Viola designed for Whitney Museum of American Art.
- 2008 Graphis Magazine, Platinum Award in Design for murals in campus recreation center at University of Cincinnati.
- 2010 California Community Foundation Mid-Career Fellowship for Visual Artists.
- 2012 National Design Award in Communication Design from the Cooper Hewitt, Smithsonian Design Museum.
- 2013 City of Los Angeles (C.O.L.A.) Individual Artist Fellowship.
- 2016 Peace Over Violence 45th Annual Humanitarian Awards Gala honoree.
- 2017 Medal of A.I.G.A. (American Institute of Graphic Arts)
- 2017 Induction to the One Club Creative Hall of Fame in New York.
