= Bruce Burdick =

Furniture and exhibit designer (1933–2021)

- Born: 1933
- Died: 2021 (aged 87–88)
- Education: University of Southern California; Art Center College of Design
- Occupation: Designer

Bruce Burdick (1933–2021) was an American designer and founder of the Burdick Group. He is known for The Burdick Group modular desk system, and designing various museum exhibits around the world, including the Rock and Roll Hall of Fame exhibit space.

== Biography ==
Bruce Burdick grew up in Pasadena, California and studied at the University of Southern California and the Art Center College of Design in Pasadena. During his time at U.S.C. he interned at the Eames Office in Los Angeles. The work of Charles and Ray Eames was an inspiration to him throughout his career.

After graduating from Art Center in 1961 he worked in the Los Angeles design firms of John Follis and Herb Rosenthal.

He founded the department of Environmental Design at the Art Center College of Design in 1971 and directed it through 1975. While there he served as the client liaison for the design and construction of Craig Ellwood's canyon-spanning Bridge Building. His elder daughter Anne Burdick teaches Media Design at the Art Center. In 1970 he founded the Burdick Group design firm in Los Angeles.

Throughout his career Burdick spoke up for industrial design: "Designers are involved with life: we touch everything! Ninety per cent of everyone's day is spent using the things we've made, yet the public is only aware of fashion designers and architects."

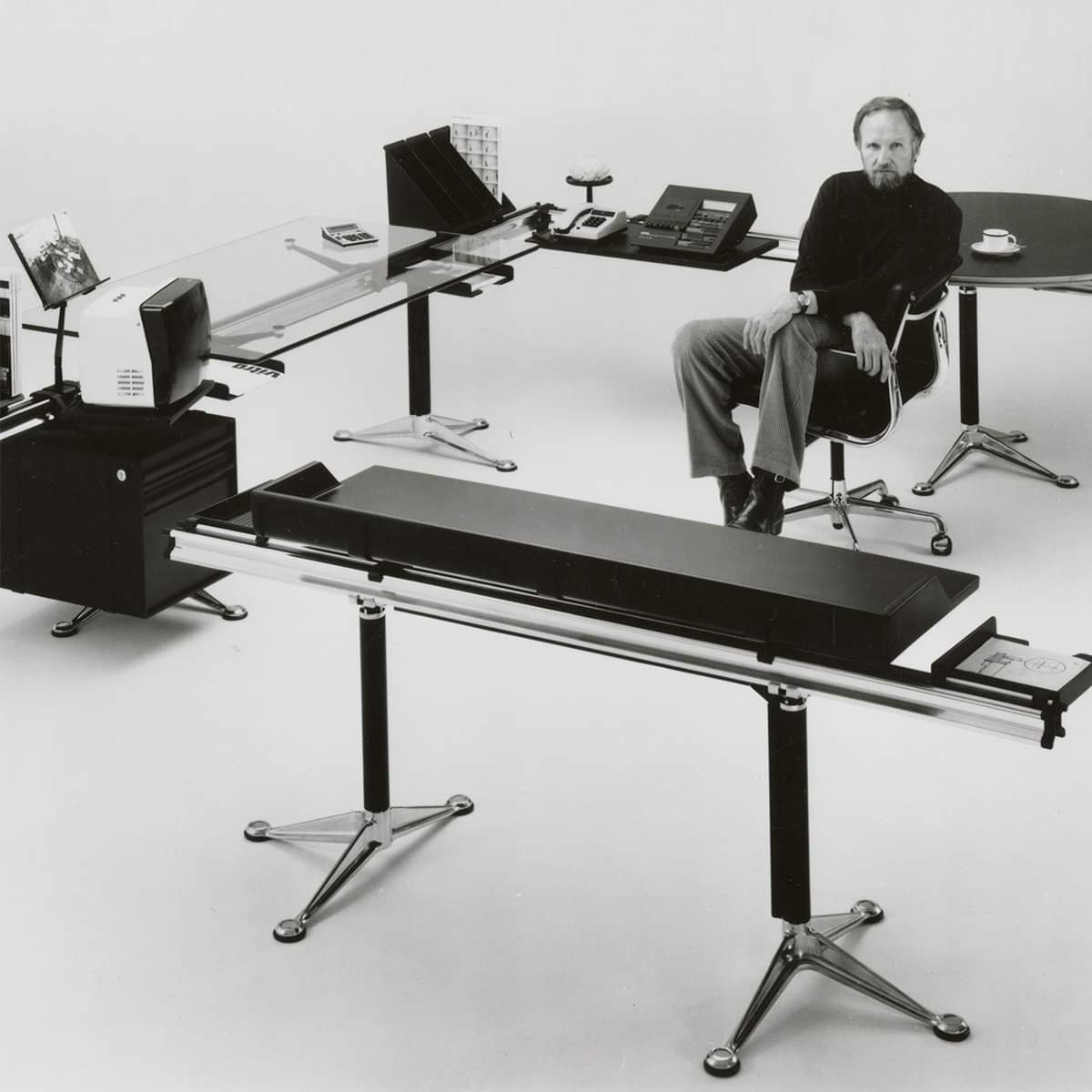
Bruce Burdick and the Burdick Group desk

In 1975 the Burdick Group moved to San Francisco.

The Burdick Group's first major exhibition opened in 1976: "Food for Life," a permanent exhibition on nutrition for the Chicago Museum of Science and Industry. Via computers, visitors related exhibit content to their own health. From this first exhibit onward Burdick strove to engage visitors with computer interactions. At that time "computer" meant mainframe. Burdick took a course in computer literacy at Berkeley's Lawrence Hall of Science to understand how computers might turn a visitor's passive experience into an active one.

In 1980, Burdick purchased a former piano warehouse at 35 South Park, San Francisco. The building accommodated a changing cast of employees and a shop where models and prototypes were built.

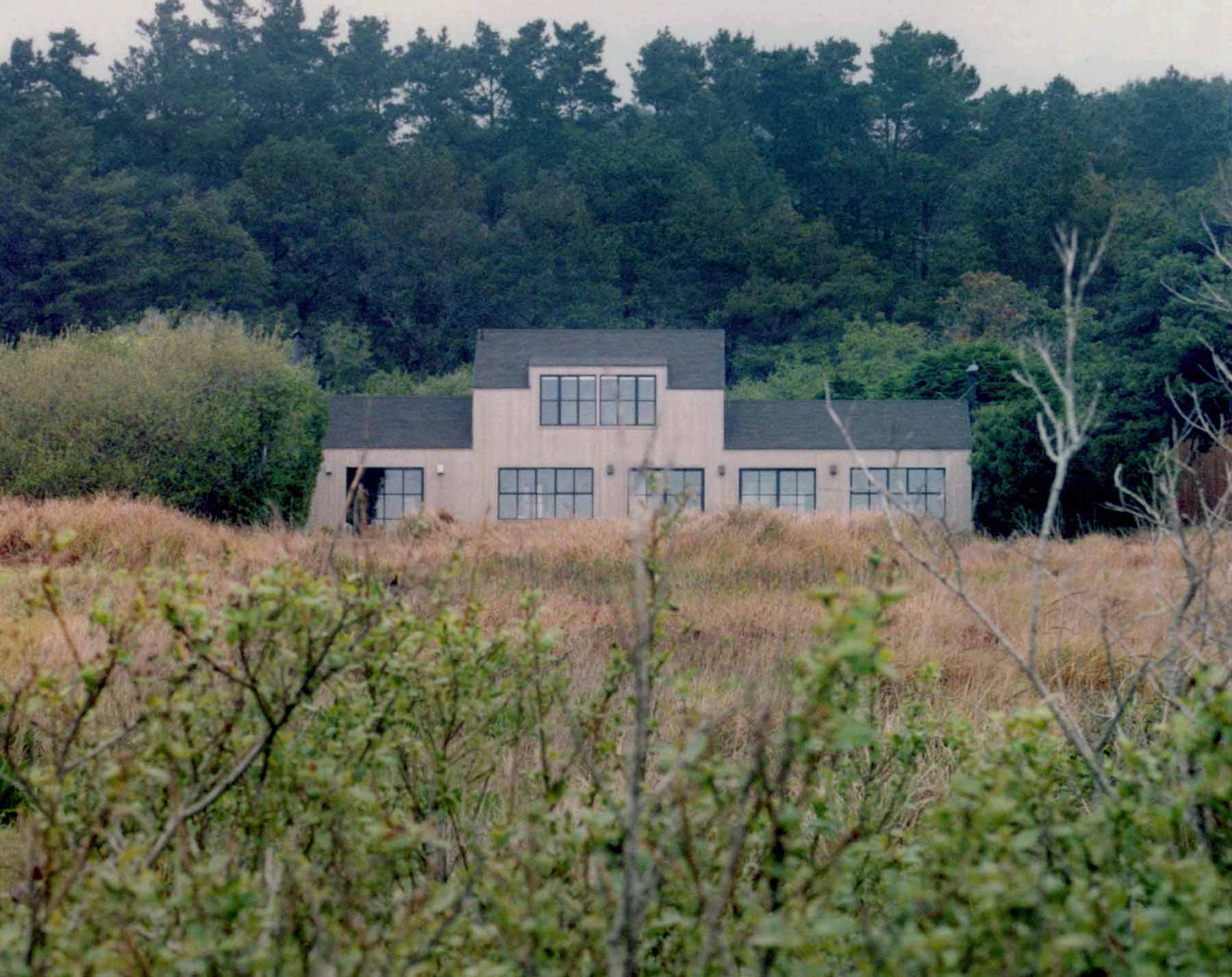
Burdick House at Sea Ranch

In that same year, Burdick designed the Burdick Group desk for Herman Miller. Supported by aluminum beams and pedestals, the components can be rearranged to put tools and resources within easy reach. As Burdick put it, "What I wanted was a desk that was responsive to the way an individual works . . . a desk that a designer could specify for 20 different people, with each one being different." Time magazine reporter Wolf van Eckardt pronounced it one of the five best industrial designs of 1981. It was Gordon Gekko's desk in the 1987 film Wall Street.

In 1983 Burdick married Susan K. Burdick, who became his design and business partner.

In 2000 the Burdicks dissolved their firm and dedicated themselves to serious travel. They split their time between a home in San Francisco and a house they designed with longtime associate Bruce Lightbody at Sea Ranch on the California coast.

A retrospective article in Graphis includes 20 pages of Burdick project photos.

== Selected works ==
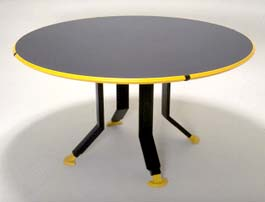
Spring Table

=== Furniture design ===
- Spring Table: multi-functional table for Herman Miller. In 1987 it was featured in International Design Magazine's Annual Design Review and selected for the International Design Excellence Awards program.
- The Burdick Group: modular desk system for Herman Miller (now MillerKnoll)
- AT&T Modular Exhibit System: Display elements that can be broken down, shipped and reconfigured
- Café Chair: aluminum stacking chair for Itoki (Japan)
- Burdick Wave: upholstered airport-type row seating. Itoki (Japan)
- Aero Table: glass-topped table for Casas (Spain) that packs flat.

=== Exhibit design ===
- Food for Life (1976), Museum of Science and Industry (Chicago). Visitors signed in to computer terminals at the entrance, giving their age, weight, height and gender. As they proceeded through colorful 3D displays on the different food groups they consulted terminals for personalized nutrition advice. The exhibit stayed up for at least 16 years.

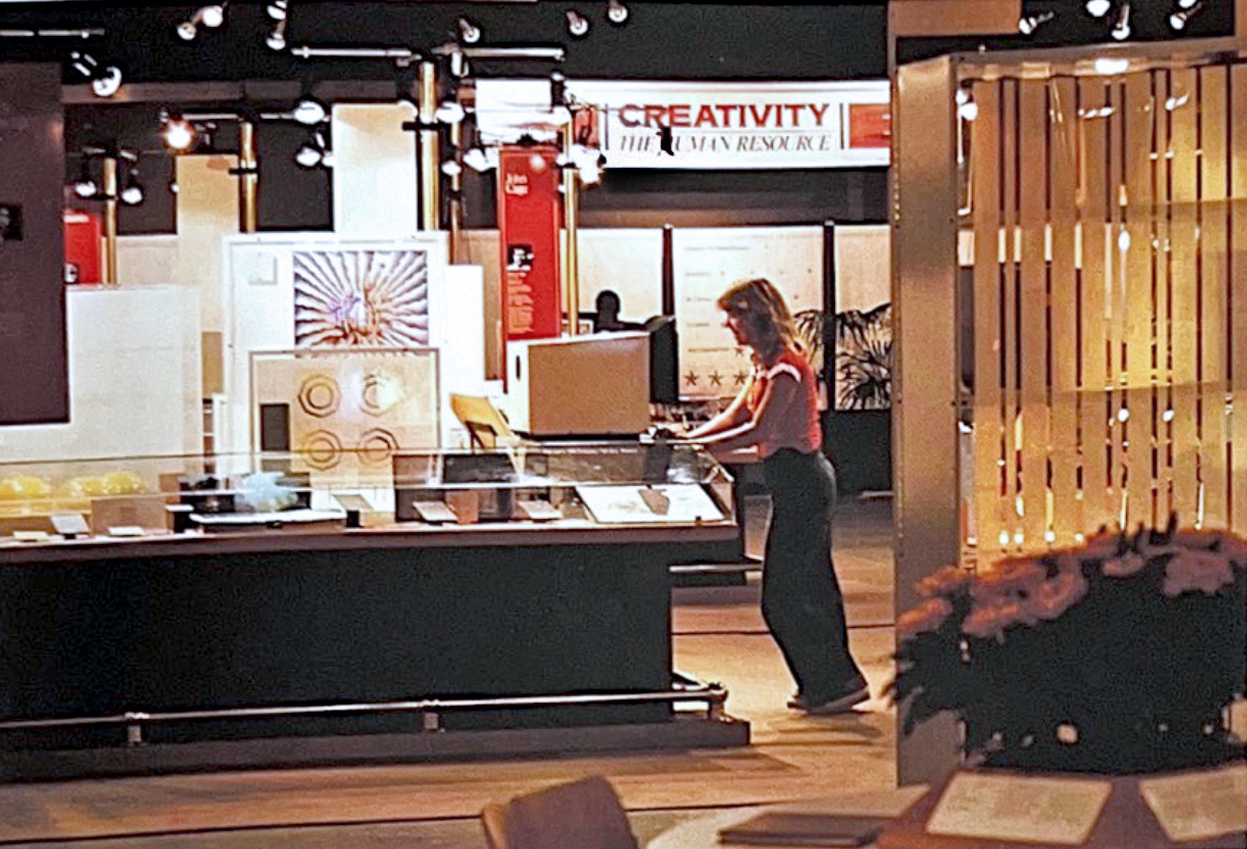
Creativity Exhibit

- Creativity: the Human Resource (1979) toured more than a dozen science museums from coast to coast. The exhibit asked "What is the creative process? Where do insights come from?" 16 artists, designers and scientists, from Judy Chicago and John Cage to Linus Pauling and Charles Townes, shared their working materials and process. Computer terminals tested people's creative potential. An animated film explored the elements of a creative climate. Ian Frazier made light of the exhibit's solemnity in a Talk of the Town item in the New Yorker. The genesis of the exhibit is described in a 1989 article in Print magazine.
- The Money Center (1981), for the Museum of Science and Industry (Chicago). From the Christian Science Monitor: "The Money Center is an imaginative arcade of economics at work, showing the function of money and banking through the use of computers, puppets, barter games, and shopping sprees. One highlight is Philosophers' Park, where the theories of economists – Keynes and Smith, for example– are traced."
- San Francisco Zoo Primate Discovery Center (1985) Interactive exhibits about the primates in the zoo.
- Kentucky Derby Museum, Louisville KY (1985, 2000) Through the film and exhibits, visitors follow a young foal from its birth all the way to the Kentucky Derby. Exhibits highlight the stories of owners, trainers and jockeys. A 360˚ theater gives an immersive experience of Derby Day. When the museum was 15 years old the Burdick Group renovated and expanded it.
- Electricity and Magnetism, California Science Center in Los Angeles (1989). From the L.A. Times: "Children and adults can explore the intricate pathways of a microchip through a microscope, power an electromagnet, or experience the charge of static electricity in this latest addition to the museum. With an interactive learning approach and a visual emphasis, the exhibit is designed to complement school curricula."
- Aramco House of Discovery, Dhahran, Saudi Arabia (1990). 26,000 feet of permanent displays in a new building. The introductory area exhibits Arab scientific and technical innovations: advances in timekeeping and navigation, astronomy, geography, mechanics and chemistry are presented in three dimensions. The rest of the museum is dedicated to petroleum technology: exploration, extraction, refining and distribution, with hands-on demonstrations throughout.
- Philips Competence Center, Eindhoven, the Netherlands (1991).
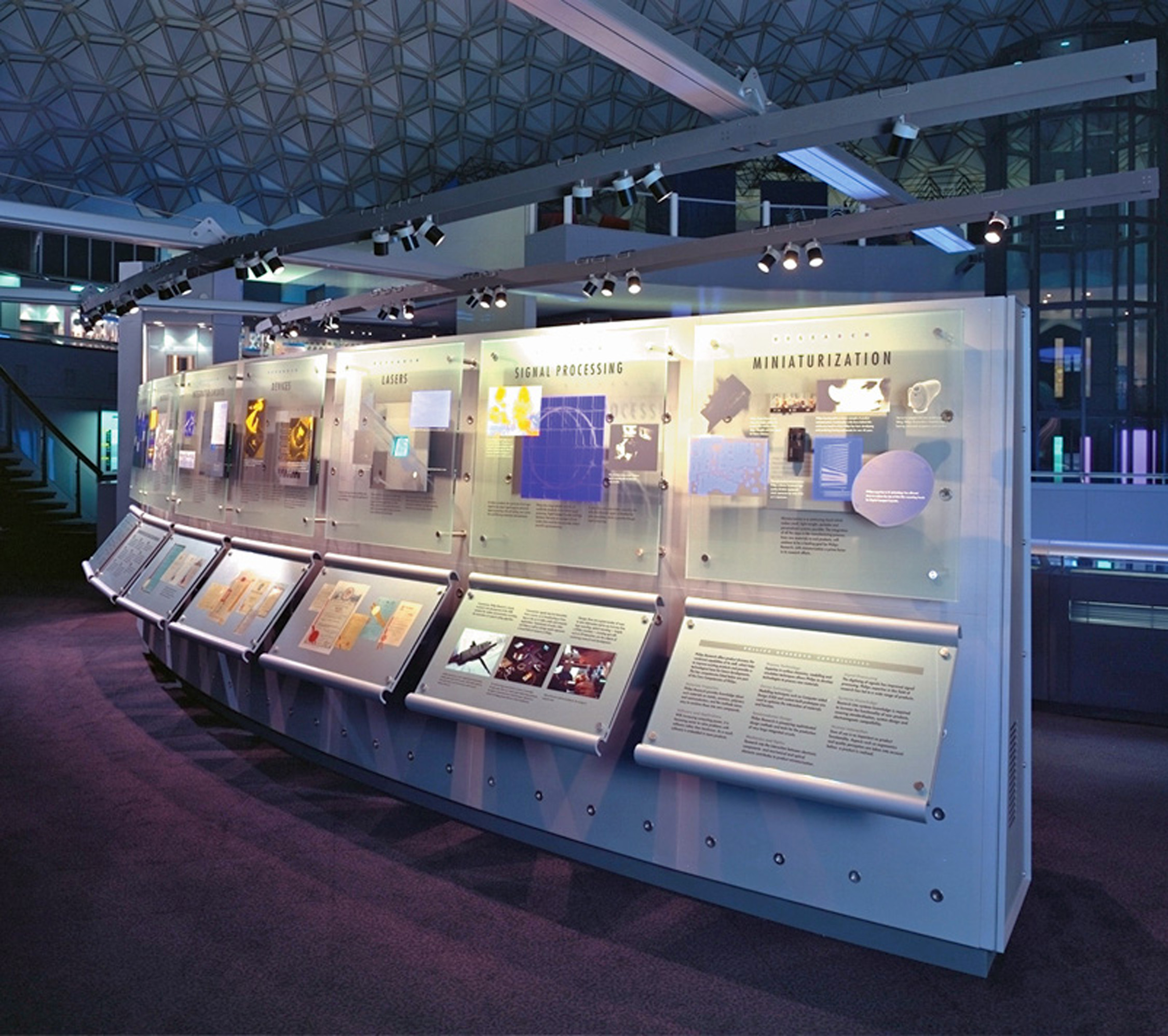
  Philips Competence Center, The Netherlands
  The Evoluon, a large concrete flying saucer, was repurposed from a threadbare science museum to a corporate "front door." From an article in Design Management Journal by Bruce and Susan Burdick: "In its recent corporate restructuring, Philips had combined some divisions, eliminated others, and, in the process, downsized. One of the ways it had done this was to identify its core competencies . . . A major part of the work of the front door would be to illustrate how these various competencies come together to produce new and significant product innovations." The exhibit's circular layout emphasized its random access character. Burdick told The Architectural Record, "Exhibits aren't like books, which you read from front to back. People move through them at their own pace and along a number of different paths."

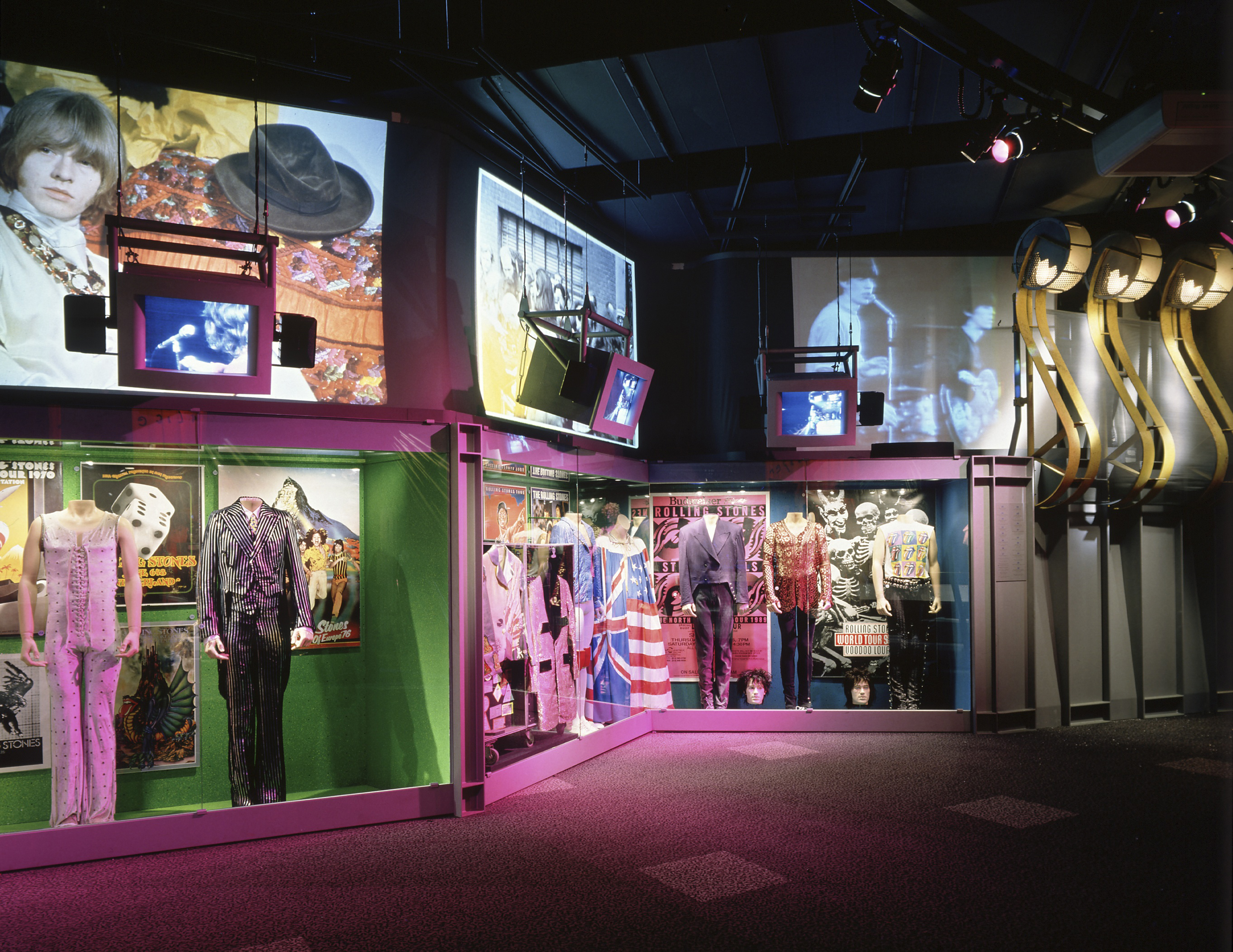
Rock & Roll Hall of Fame & Museum

- Rock & Roll Hall of Fame and Museum, Cleveland (1995). According to Peter Arendt, the director of design and construction for the Hall of Fame, Bruce and Susan Burdick convinced architect I. M. Pei to relocate and expand the building's museum space. In an article on the New York Times editorial page headed "Go to Cleveland" Frank Rich wrote: "For each musicological exhibit that might document the creation of a hit record or the influence of, say, Woody Guthrie on Bob Dylan, there is another that connects rock's history to the larger history of a city (from New Orleans in the 50's to Seattle in the 90's) or a cultural upheaval (the rise of television, the raising of skirts) or a national cataclysm (Vietnam). Rock's social critics, from the John Birch Society to Tipper Gore, are taken as seriously as rap; so are the songs' political nuances." Burdick explained the design challenge to Washington Post reporter Richard Harrington: "this is the only museum in which the people already own the art, and know it as a part of their lives. . . . Our role is not to play back what they already have, but to play it back and put it into context."
- Garden of Samsung Electronics, Seoul, Korea (1998) In corporate headquarters, a panorama of the conglomerate's activities, organized as a trip through the changing seasons.

=== Retail design ===
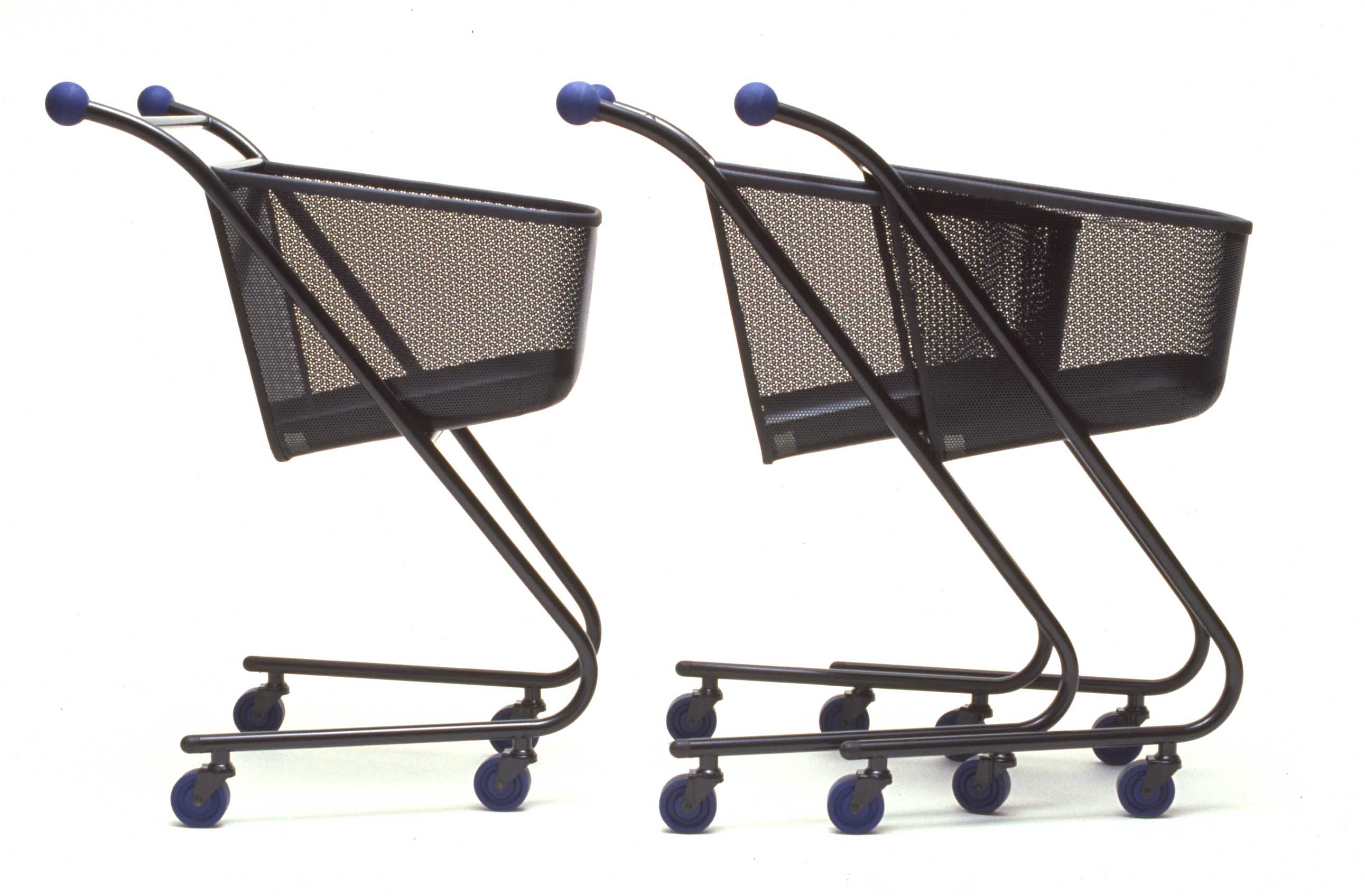
shopping carts for Esprit de Corps

- Wells Fargo Bank prototype branch: early steps toward computerized banking.
- Crayola Cafe and Store, Kansas City, MO
- Philips exhibit at EuroDisneyland, France
- Esprit Holdings: store hardware and layout worldwide
- Hallmark Gold Crown Store, Kansas City MO
- Echo showroom, New York
- ComputerCraft retail store, Houston: In 1991, when personal computers were still daunting to many people, a prototype store for the chain was designed as a computer school, with interactive terminals for customers.
