= Kentucky Derby Museum =

Thoroughbred horse racing museum in Louisville, Kentucky, US

Coordinates: 38.2053°N 85.7712°W

- Established: 1985
- Location: Churchill Downs, Louisville, Kentucky
- Collections: Thoroughbred horse racing
- Website: www.derbymuseum.org

The Kentucky Derby Museum is an American Thoroughbred horse racing museum located on the grounds of Churchill Downs in Louisville, Kentucky. Dedicated to preserving the history of the Kentucky Derby, it first opened its doors to the public in the spring of 1985. Much of its early funding came from a donation from the estate of James Graham Brown.

The museum consists of two floors of exhibit space, including a 360-degree theater that shows the HD film The Greatest Race. Through the film and exhibits, visitors can learn what goes into the breeding and training of a young foal and the path it takes to the Kentucky Derby's winner circle. Every Kentucky Derby win is honored in the Warner L. Jones Time Machine, where visitors can watch any Kentucky Derby from 1918 to the present day. Exhibits highlight the stories of owners, trainers and jockeys as well as the importance of African American jockeys and trainers to the race and the Thoroughbred industry. Guided tours of Churchill Downs' barn and infield areas, jockeys' quarters, "millionaires row" and press box are also offered. Exhibits were designed by Bruce Burdick's San Francisco design firm The Burdick Group.

== 2010 renovation ==
The museum was devastated by flash flooding on August 4, 2009, and remained closed for recovery and cleanup. Every exhibit on the main floor of the museum was affected in some way by water damage. Since the exhibits needed to be dismantled and many were destroyed, the museum's board of directors decided to embrace the opportunity for a renovation. The museum underwent major renovations and reopened on April 18, 2010, in time for the 2010 Kentucky Derby. Though a significant renovation had been planned, the flood damages accelerated the time schedule and increased the expected size of the renovation project.

== Champions' trophies ==
The museum has documented the whereabouts of most of the trophies given to Derby winners. As of 2007, it is still working to locate ten missing trophies, eight of which are from the 1924 design currently in use, and two are of a different design given out in 1922 and 1923. The missing trophies for the year and its winner are as follows:

- 1922 : Morvich
- 1923 : Zev
- 1924 : Black Gold
- 1929 : Clyde Van Dusen
- 1936 : Bold Venture
- 1947 : Jet Pilot
- 1951 : Count Turf
- 1962 : Decidedly
- 1986 : Ferdinand
- 2002 : War Emblem

== Champions' cemetery ==
The museum has arranged for the reburial on its grounds of five past Derby winners whose original graves were threatened by land development. The past champions now interred here are:

- Brokers Tip (1930–1953)
- Carry Back (1958–1983)
- Sunny's Halo (1980–2003)
- Swaps (1952–1972)
- Dust Commander (1967–1991)

The 2006 Derby winner Barbaro (2003–2007) is interred just outside an entrance to Churchill Downs, and also outside the museum. Owners Roy and Gretchen Jackson chose to bury his remains in a location where his admirers would not have to pay an admission fee.

== See also ==
- List of attractions and events in the Louisville metropolitan area
- List of museums in the Louisville metropolitan area
