= Bésame Cosmetics =

American cosmetics company

- Industry: cosmetics
- Founded: 2004
- Founder: Gabriela Hernandez
- Headquarters: Los Angeles, California
- Website: https://besamecosmetics.com/

Bésame Cosmetics, Inc. is a cosmetics company founded in 2004 and based in Los Angeles, California. It was founded and currently owned by makeup historian and author Gabriela Hernandez. Bésame Cosmetics recreates makeup shades, packaging, and products inspired by the 1920s-1970s. The company is known for its cake mascara product, several collaborations with the Walt Disney Company, and creating the lipstick worn by actress Hayley Atwell on the ABC Marvel show Agent Carter.

== Background ==
The founder of Bésame Cosmetics, Gabriela Hernandez, emigrated from Buenos Aires, Argentina, to the United States as a child. Hernandez graduated from the ArtCenter College of Design in Pasadena, California.

Gabriela Hernandez and her husband Fergus Hernandez started the company online in 2004. The first product created and sold by the brand was lipstick in the shade "Bésame Red" which has deep hue and blue-toned base. Hernandez has said that the brand was inspired by her grandmother and mother and their thoughtful application of makeup in 1970s Buenos Aires and wanting to preserve the idea of makeup as ritual.

In 2005, Bésame opened a boutique shop in Burbank, California which also hosts a cosmetics museum. The brand expanded the cosmetics line to include lipsticks, face powders, rouges, brushes, and more, all based on historical makeup that Hernandez had in her personal antique collection. Based on actual vintage models, the products are enhanced with the efficacy of modern technology. To continue the throwback feel, the products come in red and gold stylized containers of gold-plated nickel.

== Business ==
Bésame Cosmetics benefited from early online sales and dedicated word-of-mouth support and later attracted more mainstream attention. This led to appearances on film and television productions such as "Mad Men," "Once Upon A Time in Hollywood," "The Artist," and "Feud: Bette and Joan." In American Horror Story, Emma Roberts' character wears Bésame lipstick and Jessica Lange’s character is seen to use the pressed powder and cake mascara. In Agent Carter, the title character's use of Bésame Cosmetics lipstick was so popular that the actress, Hayley Atwell, shared the brand to fans. These appearances and credits make Hernandez’s expertise as a makeup historian sought after in the industry.

Bésame releases exclusive collections for brands like Disney and Marvel as well as honoring memorable historical women like Lucille Ball or Marilyn Monroe.

As of 2011, Bésame revenue reached the low seven figures with plans to expand distribution from 14 countries to 30 as well as increase its product line.

In 2021, Hernandez says the brand is looking to make more products refillable and low waste with focus on sustainable packaging.
