= Nick Pugh =

American artist (born 1967)

Nick Pugh (born January 15, 1967) is an artist, designer, and educator known for his work in digital fine art, originality in design, entertainment, and transportation. His specialty is futuristic vehicle design, engineering and construction.

== Artistic themes ==
Pugh has explored many artistic themes including environmental-human entropy, bioengineering, advanced concept transportation, and evolutionary nanotechnology.

== Picture car designer ==
In 2015 Pugh worked on vehicle design for the film Logan. He created the look of the limo, helped design the Reaver trucks and created the concept of the Auto-trucks . In 2017 Pugh designed rovers for the film Ad Astra Ad Astra (film) and also designed futuristic vehicles for the streaming show The First . These 'picture cars' are functional stunt vehicles used in live action filming.

== Visual effects artist ==
From 1997-2014 Pugh was a senior concept artist for visual effects company Rhythm&Hues. During his time there he designed numerous characters and environments for feature films and theme park attractions. Notably Pugh helped create the 3D versions of Scooby Doo, Garfield and Alvin and the Chipmunks as well as the Emma Frost character in X-Men First Class.

== Xeno III ==
Pugh is also the creator of the Xeno III, a fully functioning, 500 horsepower, natural gas-fueled concept car. The design of Xeno III is raw and skeletal, but it is largely gold plated removing it from being either being a racecar or a luxury car.

The Xeno III project is the subject of the book by Mark Christensen titled Build The Perfect Beast, published in 2001 by Thomas Dunne. The entire project was profiled in 2002 by Car Design News.

During the Xeno III project, Pugh co-founded an alternative-fuel transportation company called NGV-USA to do research in the field of automotive engineering. As a member of this firm, he received a U.S. patent 5,370,418 for inventing a unique design wherein natural gas cylinders are integrated with a standard ladder chassis. A prototype of the chassis was installed into a customized Dodge Ram Van called the "Long Ranger." This van was used by Cal Start and other governmental organizations to promote alternative-fuel vehicles.

== Luminair ==
Pugh’s first solo publication, Luminair, presents a collection of digital life paintings developed in a novel approach to traditional representational art. Painting from life, Pugh's canvas is the laptop computer screen and his palette is the multitude of colors available to the digital artist. Traveling from his home in California to rural New England, Europe, and South America, he has painted a variety of images that capture the light and emotion of the scenes. For aspiring digital painters, the book contains instruction on the process used to create the images in the work.

== Design instruction ==
From 2005-2014, Pugh taught design courses at Art Center College of Design, including Originality and Digital Rendering and Pitch Development. In addition, Pugh is the creator of a series created with the Gnomon Workshop] on the topics of creature design illustration, environment rendering, and originality in design.

== Concept Design series ==
In addition to Luminair, Pugh's work is featured in both releases in the Design Studio Press series Concept Design, with his work featured on the cover of Concept Design 2.

== Personal life ==
Born in Paris, Pugh grew up in Kensington in the San Francisco area and over his life has lived in England, Brazil, France and New England. In 1986 he moved to Pasadena to attend Art Center College of Design after a year at Coventry University in the UK. Pugh has lived in the Los Angeles area or in New Hampshire since then.
