= Ian Stendal =

Czech photographer (1913-1992)

- Born: Jan Stendal; January 14, 1913; Prague, Kingdom of Bohemia
- Died: November 18, 1992 (aged 79); Los Angeles, California, US
- Education: University of Frankfurt
- Known for: Photography
- Spouse: Olivia Newmark

Ian Avram Stendal (born Jan Stendal; January 14, 1913 – November 18, 1992) was a Czech-born American photographer.

== Biography ==
Ian Stendal was born on January 14, 1913, to middle-class parents in Prague in what was then the Kingdom of Bohemia within Austria-Hungary. His father, Konrad Stendal, was an executive at the Chemické závody Sokolov chemical company, and his mother was Sara Marculis, whose family owned several successful dime stores in Prague and Plzeň. Stendal took an early interest in photography while working in his uncle's camera shop in Prague. In the early 1930s, Stendal was a student at the University of Frankfurt in Germany, where he took classes with Paul Tillich and Theodor Adorno. Although he had planned to study art, Stendal left Frankfurt when the Nazis came to power. In 1934, he took a sales position with the Swiss camera company Paillard Bolex. In 1939, Stendal was sent to the United States as a Paillard-Bolex representative at the New York World's Fair.

During his stay in the United States, the Germans invaded and occupied Czechoslovakia, and Stendal was cut off from his family and home. Through the intervention of Ezra Brockway, the U.S. importer of Paillard-Bolex, Stendal was able to remain in the United States. However, in 1940, Stendal went to Canada in order to enlist in the Canadian armed forces. He was accepted into the 1st Canadian Infantry and was sent to England in late 1940. In 1942, Stendal was wounded in the catastrophic Dieppe Raid. He was taken prisoner, but after two failed attempts, he escaped from a prisoner of war camp. During the same period, his mother and her family were deported to the Theresienstadt concentration camp, and none survived the war. His father, who was not Jewish, died in 1944. It is believed that Konrad Stendal committed suicide by ingesting photographic processing chemicals at hand in his brother's store. After the war, Ian Stendal became a naturalized Canadian. He returned to work for Paillard-Bolex and moved to Los Angeles, California. While acting as the Paillard-Bolex agent for the major film studios, Stendal also opened a small photographic studio on Fairfax Boulevard in Los Angeles. He left Paillard-Bolex in 1950 to become a technical advisor to the Metro-Goldwyn-Mayer studios. In the late 1940s, Stendal renewed a friendship with Adorno, who was then living in L.A., and Stendal became involved in the émigré intellectual community coalescing around Hollywood.

Around this time, Stendal became fascinated by Los Angeles street life and turned his lens toward capturing the vast diversity of life he found in the city. Stendal sought very literal and personal renderings of his subjects, giving the audience a more emotional and direct experience of what they might otherwise consider prosaic. Much of his street photography is marked by a brightness and vitality unusual in that art form, and he was one of the few street photographers to embrace Kodachrome film, eschewing the black and white standard to celebrate the vigor and energy of California life.

Unlike his fellow émigrés, many of whom returned to Europe after the war, Stendal remained in California until he died on November 18, 1992, in North Hollywood, Los Angeles. In 1952, he married Olivia Newmark (b. Olga Navarova), an actress he had met while working on the set of Nancy Goes to Rio.

In 1958, Stendal began teaching photography at the Art Center College of Design in Pasadena, California. In 1962, the International Museum of Photography at George Eastman House mounted Stendal's first solo museum show. Stendal was included in the 1967 "New Documents" exhibition at the Museum of Modern Art in New York City along with Lee Friedlander, Garry Winogrand and Diane Arbus. In 1989, the Museum of Modern Art displayed a major retrospective of Stendal's works. His work was displayed again by the San Francisco Museum of Modern Art as a retrospective in 1992, just before his death. Having grown up in the verdant city of Prague, Stendal was fascinated by the bizarre and thrilling images of people almost cavalierly adapting to a harsh life in the desert. Throughout the 1970s and 80s, he made yearly summer trips to Palm Springs, Las Vegas, Phoenix, and Tucson. A selection of photographs from these trips was published as Urban / Desert and was displayed at the Whatley Gallery in Los Angeles in 1998. A large collection of his work, unseen by the public, is currently in the hands of a private collector who has plans of releasing some of the photographs for publication.
