= Banjo (disambiguation) =

A banjo is a stringed instrument common in folk and popular music.

Banjo may also refer to:

== People ==
=== Nickname ===
- Terence "Banjo" Bannon (born 1967), Northern Ireland mountaineer and adventurer
- Bill Cornett (1890–c. 1959), or "Banjo Bill", American traditional folk singer, banjo player and politician
- Banjo Matthews (1932–1996), NASCAR driver, car owner and builder
- Barney McKenna (1939–2012), Irish musician and a founding member of The Dubliners, nicknamed "Banjo Barney"
- Banjo Paterson (1864–1941), Australian poet, journalist and author
- Ikey Robinson or "Banjo Ikey" (1904–1990), American banjoist and vocalist
- "Banjo" Beale, Australian interior designer

=== Surname ===
- Ashley Banjo (born 1988), English street dancer, choreographer and actor
- Chris Banjo (born 1990), American National Football League player
- Jordan Banjo (born 1992), a British street dancer
- Kay Banjo (born 1992), American soccer player
- Tunji Banjo (fl. 1977–1982), Nigerian-Irish former footballer
- Victor Banjo (1930–1967), Nigerian Army colonel

=== Stage name ===
- Banjō Ginga, Japanese actor and voice actor Takashi Tanaka (born 1948)

== Arts and entertainment ==
=== Films ===
- Banjo (1947 film), an American film directed by Richard Fleischer
- Banjo (2016 film), an Indian film
- the title character of Banjo the Woodpile Cat, a 1979 animated short

=== Music ===
- "Banjo" (song), by Rascal Flatts from the album Changed
- "The Banjo" (song), a 2014 single by Norwegian formation 3LOGY
- The Banjo (Gottschalk), an 1853 piano composition by Louis Moreau Gottschalk
- Banjo, of the Overflow, an 1892 poem by Australian poet Francis Kenna

=== Television ===
- "Banjo (Space Ghost Coast to Coast)", an episode of Space Ghost Coast to Coast

=== Fictional characters ===
- Haran Banjo, the main character in the 1978's Japanese anime series Daitarn 3
- Banjo, one of two protagonists in the Banjo-Kazooie video game series
- Mister Banjo, a recurring enemy of the Marvel Family
- Banjo Possum, a minor character in the Tiny Toon Adventures animated television series
- Dr. Banjo, a character from the Futurama episode "A Clockwork Origin"

== Other uses ==
- Banjo (chocolate bar), a popular British chocolate bar during the 1970s
- Egg banjo, a type of fried egg sandwich
- Banjo (samba), a musical instrument
- Banjo (application), a surveillance app
- Banjo (signal), an obsolete railroad signalling device
- Banjo (wood lathe), a fixture on a wood-turning lathe
- Banjo enclosure, an archaeological feature
- Banjo Island, Bermuda
- Banjo Awards, presented by the National Book Council of Australia from 1974 to 1997 for both fiction and non-fiction
- Banjo River, a first-class river in Ōita Prefecture, Japan
- ProFe Banjo, a family of Czech T-tailed gliders and motor gliders
- Banjo ray, another name for the fiddler ray (Trygonorrhina)
- Battle of Banjo, a First World War battle in Africa
- Japanese gunboat Banjō, a warship of the early Imperial Japanese Navy
- A slang term for the Australian $10 note because one side has a picture of Banjo Paterson
- A dinosaur specimen of the genus Australovenator
- A typeface from French foundry Deberny & Peignot

== See also ==
- Banjos banjos or banjofish, a species of fish
