= Banjo (application) =

Surveillance mobile app

Banjo is a Utah-based surveillance software company that claimed to use AI to identify events for public safety agencies. It was founded in 2010 by Damien Patton. The company gained notoriety in 2020 when the State of Utah signed a $20 million contract for their "panopticon" software. In May, the company experienced backlash and suspending of contracts after Patton's membership in the Ku Klux Klan and participation in a drive-by terrorist attack on a synagogue was revealed.

In 2020, the company had approximately 200 employees in South Jordan, Utah, Park City, Utah, Washington D.C., and Menlo Park, California and had received approximately $126 million in funding.

A 2021 audit requested by the State of Utah that tried to assess algorithmic bias in the AI declared that "Banjo does not use techniques that meet the industry definition of artificial Intelligence".

== History ==
=== Social media application ===
After building a "friend-finding" app called Peer Compass for a Las Vegas hackathon in 2010 and then a Google hackathon in 2011 (the app won both events), Damien Patton founded Banjo as a social media application for phones to aggregate and discover live events by scraping public, geotagged content from Instagram, Twitter, Facebook, Foursquare, Path, Google Plus, VKontakte and EyeEm, then indexed by location, time and content. In 2016, Banjo was gathering information from more than 1.2 billion public social media accounts. Shortly after the Google event, BlueRun Ventures invested $800,000 in the company. Techcrunch called it "the creepy/awesome cyber-stalking app" and stated it had 500,000 downloads by December 2011, when the company launched a web version. The app had one million users by April 2012.

After attending South by Southwest in 2011 and seeing other friend-finding apps like Glancee, Sonar, and Highlight, Patton told his investors in 2012 that he was pivoting to Banjo and fired all but one employee. Banjo's location-enabled social aggregation application launched in November 2012, though it was still described in December 2012 as an app to find friends who are nearby.

=== News application ===
After Patton realized Banjo's potential application to the Boston Marathon bombing manhunt, Banjo went from social media to brand marketing and to service news companies, launching in January 2014 and calling it Banjo Enterprise. He also said the company quickly uncovered the 2014 Shooting of Michael Brown, and was alerted about the 2015 East Village gas explosion 58 minutes before the Associated Press reported it.

The company's revenue in 2014 was under $1 million. In March 2014 the company completed a $16 million Series B round of financing from Balderton Capital with BlueRun Ventures investing again and VegasTechFund as a new investor. In May 2015 the company received their Series C financing when SoftBank invested $100 million into the company. At the time it had 60 employees on staff, including their chief data scientist Pedro Alves, a Mensa member. The company was based in Las Vegas. Patton said the company was looking into applications in the financial markets and had no intention on doing business with federal law enforcement agencies, stating "I don't think those agencies could fucking deal with someone like me".

A profile of Patton in 2015 called him a "damn good driver" and gave an anecdote about their software uncovering a Florida State University shooting in 2014, explaining that is why NBC and ESPN were paying customers. Other customers included Anheuser Busch, the BBC, and Sinclair Broadcasting.

In 2016 Entrepreneur said the software was used by "thousands of news outlets, insurance firms, security contractors and more".

=== Live Time Intelligence application ===
The company pivoted to their Live Time Intelligence application, used to highlight events on surveillance cameras for police and fire, in 2019. Social media is only used with any PII removed. Banjo suggests their service can be used for car crashes, school shootings, and fires.

Banjo courted the state of Utah with its services, moving the company from Vegas to Park City, Utah in 2018 and signed a $750,000 contract in November 2018 with the attorney general's office. Park City signed a contract for free access to their services as part of a pilot program in February 2019, and the city reported about half of the city's private business surveillance cameras were feeding the system.

In 2019 a lobbyist for the company told the Salt Lake Valley Emergency Communications Center that the company "essentially do what Palantir does, but they do it live."

In 2020 the state of Utah signed a $20.7 million five-year contract with Banjo, leading to increased scrutiny. Vice said they were "Turning Utah Into a Surveillance Panopticon". Senator Mike Lee, who said he's known Patton for several years, complimented Live Time and their commitment to privacy. The Utah Attorney General's Office, Utah's Department of Public Safety, and University of Utah all signed contracts with the company, though the Utah Transit Authority demurred.

Utah's Libertas Institute has expressed concern about Live Time, as has American Civil Liberties Union's Utah branch and the Electronic Freedom Foundation.

In March 2020, VICE's Motherboard uncovered a "shadow company" named Pink Unicorn Labs that developed apps for iPhone and Android with no outward connection to Banjo. The apps were designed to harvest social media data and "secretly farming peoples' user tokens", with app names like "One Direction Fan App", "EDM Fan App", and "Formula Racing App." It led to comparisons to Cambridge Analytica.

The Salt Lake Tribune discovered that Utah's Intermountain Healthcare had a $60,000 contract with Banjo, signed in April 2020. Intermountain would provide patient counts (room occupancy) and receive access to the LiveTime app.

Goshen, Indiana's Police Department signed a $20,000 contract with Banjo in early March 2020.

=== Neo-Nazi links ===
In April 2020, Matt Stroud of OneZero uncovered CEO Patton's involvement with the Nashville, Tennessee-based Dixie Knights chapter of the Ku Klux Klan. In June 1992, when Patton was 17, he drove Grand Knight Leonard William Armstrong during a drive-by shooting with a TEC-9 on the West End Synagogue. Police arrested Patton and confiscated an AK-47. He was then released to the custody of Christian music producer Jonathan David Brown. Patton then fled the state with the assistance of Brown.

Patton confirmed his membership in the KKK and involvement with the white power skinheads, which he called "the foot soldiers for groups like the Ku Klux Klan and the Aryan Nations". OneZero republished a picture printed in The Tennessean of Patton at an Aryan Nations meeting where he and other members are giving the Nazi salute.

Patton served in the U.S. Navy and admitted to fraternizing with skinheads. In a 2015 Inc. profile, he said he wanted to enlist after seeing the 1990 Gulf War on TV. He said he rose up the ranks on the aircraft carrier Kitty Hawk, leaving after two tours, ending up in San Diego, California. He then became the chief mechanic on a NASCAR racecar sponsored by Lowe's after starting on a pit crew in 1993.

=== Contract suspensions ===
Utah Attorney General Sean Reyes suspended the $20 million contract in late April 2020 after the KKK ties came out and would review its use.

The University of Utah suspended its use, stating it has "no tolerance for racism or bias. The university expects this of itself and its business partners." In May 2020 the university terminated its $500,000 contract and demanded all data be returned.

NAACP's Salt Lake Branch president stated they were "appalled" and it was "extremely alarming as to the data that he has acquired". The Indiana contract was also suspended.

On April 29, 2020, Banjo stated they would suspend all contracts in the state, though they did not mention Intermountain Healthcare.

Rep. Andrew Stoddard stated the investigation into the company was "long overdue", and Rep. Cory Maloy also expressed concern. On May 4, Utah's Attorney General Office asked Utah State Auditor John Dougall to review their contracts with Banjo, to look for algorithmic bias, and to ensure privacy.

The AI Now Institute linked Banjo with Clearview AI, as both have far-right ties. While Banjo doesn't have explicit far-right algorithmic goals like Clearview does, it still raises concerns about algorithmic bias, even if unintentional. Other historic Silicon Valley links to far-right ideology mentioned include Jeffrey Epstein, William Shockley, and James Damore.

=== Resignation ===
On May 8, 2020, Patton resigned from the board and as CEO of Banjo, removing all decisionmaking authority. Justin R. Lindsey, who has been CTO for less than a year, has been named CEO. Lindsey had been CTO of the FBI immediately after 9/11.

=== Rebranding as safeXai ===
In February 2021, it was discovered that the company quietly renamed itself as safeXai. The name had been filed in September 2020; Patton remains a minority shareholder.
