= AAWT =

AAWT may refer to:

- American Association of Woodturners
- Australian Alps Walking Track
- Annual Average Weekday Traffic, a measure of Annual average daily traffic
- Aland Advanced Water Technology
