= Banjo (wood lathe) =

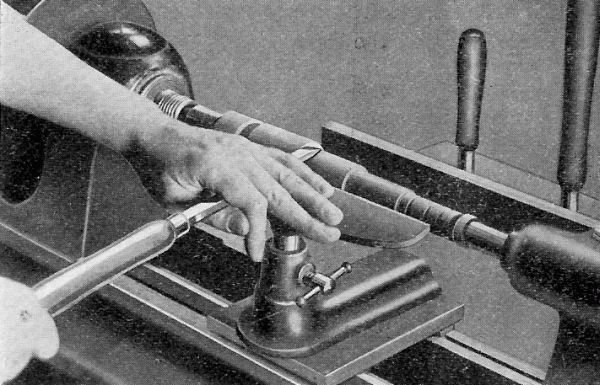
The resemblance in shape to a banjo may be seen in the fixture shown at bottom center under the operator's hand

In the craft of woodturning, a banjo is a common term for a fixture on the wood lathe, mounted on the lathe's bed, for holding the toolrest. It allows for adjustment of the toolrest in various positions, by the lathe operator, making it possible to hold the turning tool in the most convenient position for removing material from the spinning wood. The chosen position of the fixture can be locked in place on the lathe's bed in various ways, the most common method being a lever at the forward end of the fixture which acts upon an eccentric shaft with an attached clamp to secure the fixture to the lathe's bed.
