= Rosalind S. Helderman =

American journalist (born 1978)

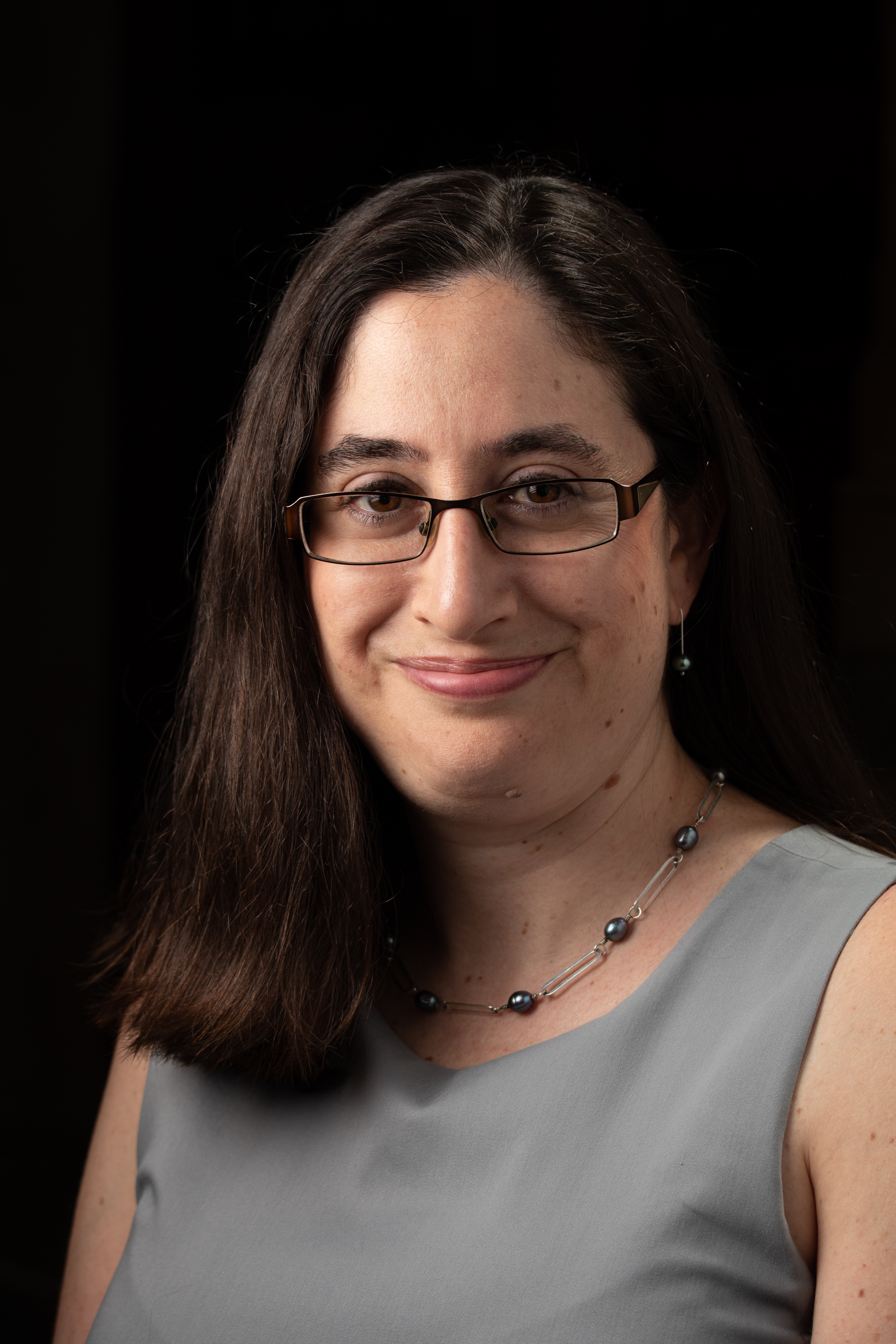
- Helderman at the 2018 Pulitzer Prize awards ceremony
- Born: Rosalind Sarah Helderman; October 3, 1978 (age 48); Nashville, Tennessee, U.S.
- Education: Harvard University
- Occupation: Journalist
- Years active: 2001-present
- Employer: The Washington Post
- Awards: George Polk Award; Pulitzer Prize

Rosalind S. Helderman (born October 3, 1978) is a journalist in the United States. For over two decades, she was a political enterprise and investigations reporter for The Washington Post, though she is now the Supreme Court editor for The New York Times.

== Biography ==
Helderman was born to Hal and Phyllis Helderman and raised in metropolitan Nashville, Tennessee. Her family is Jewish. She graduated from the West End Synagogue’s Beit Miriam Religious School and earned a B.A. in history from Harvard University in 2001, where she was managing editor of The Harvard Crimson.

Helderman joined The Post as a reporter in 2001 as a summer intern. She was initially a general assignment reporter for the newspaper, spending 10 years covering local news around the Washington region before joining the national staff in 2011 to cover Congress. She was then promoted in 2014 to The Post's national political investigations and enterprise team, on which she covered the Clinton email controversy, the Mueller investigation, Donald Trump's efforts to overturn the 2020 election, and the January 6th attack. She is a regular contributor to MSNBC.

Helderman was named Outstanding Journalist of the Year by the Virginia Press Association; won a George Polk Award in 2014; and was one of the investigators whose coverage of Donald Trump's 2016 presidential campaign won a 2018 Pulitzer Prize. She won another

In 2025, Helderman joined The New York Times as their Supreme Court editor, a newly created role.

== Works ==
- Introduction and analysis with Matt Zapotosky for the Mueller Report by The Washington Post ISBN 978-1982129736
