= Landmark Center (St. Paul) =

Historic building in Saint Paul, Minnesota

- Old Federal Courts Building
- U.S. National Register of Historic Places
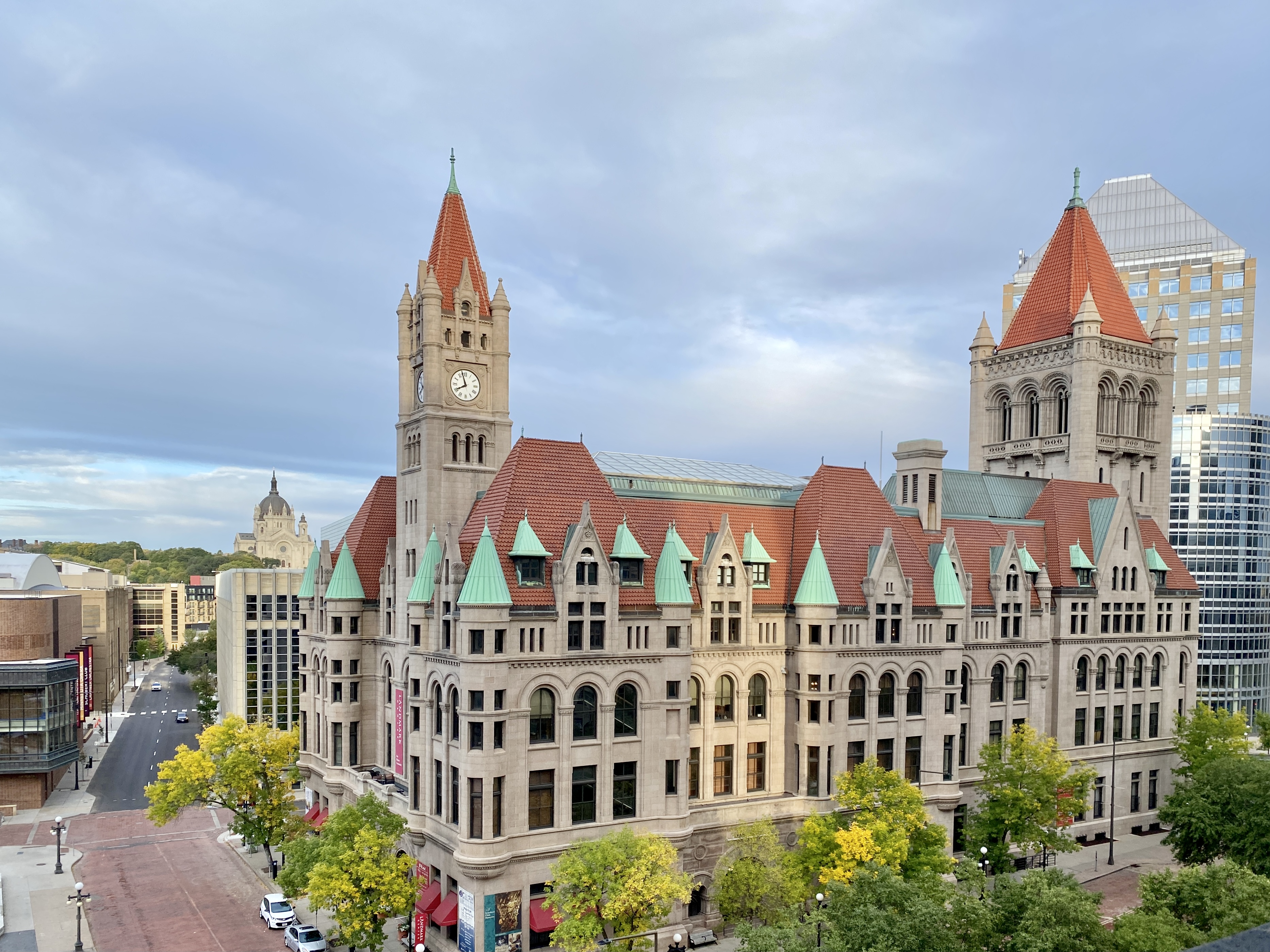

- Location within Minnesota Location within the United States
- Interactive map showing the location of the Landmark Center
- Location: 75 5th Street West; Saint Paul, Minnesota
- Coordinates: 44°56′44″N 93°5′50″W
- Built: 1894–1901
- Architect: Willoughby J. Edbrooke
- Architectural style: Richardsonian Romanesque
- NRHP reference No.: 69000076
- Added to NRHP: March 24, 1969

St. Paul's historic Landmark Center, completed in 1902, originally served as the United States Post Office, Courthouse, and Custom House for the state of Minnesota. It was designed by Willoughby J. Edbrooke, who served as Supervising Architect of the U.S. Treasury Department in 1891–92. Edbrooke designed a body of public architecture, much of which, like this structure, was completed after his 1896 death. Landmark Center stands at 75 West Fifth Street in Rice Park and is now an arts and culture center.

The exterior is pink granite ashlar with a Ludowici clay tile roof, steeply pitched to shed snow and adorned by numerous turrets, gables and dormers. Cylindrical corner towers with conical turrets occupy almost every change of projection. There are two massive towers, one of which houses a clock. The exterior is almost devoid of carved detail. The interior features a five-story courtyard with skylight and rooms with 20-foot ceilings, appointed with marble and carved mahogany and oak finishes. Its Romanesque Revival architecture is similar to Edbrooke's Old Post Office Building in Washington D.C.

John Dillinger's girlfriend Evelyn Frechette, Alvin "Creepy" Karpis, "Doc" Barker and other members of the Barker-Karpis gang were tried in the building when it served as a federal courthouse.

Judges Walter Henry Sanborn and John B. Sanborn Jr. kept their chambers here while serving on the Eighth Circuit Court of Appeals. U.S. Supreme Court Justice Harry Blackmun worked in the building as a law clerk to the younger Sanborn in 1932–33.

In the 1970s, a citizens' group saved the building from demolition and, guided by supervising architect Donald (Don) J. Leier, an expert in restoration architecture, restored it to its previous grandeur. It was placed on the National Register of Historic Places and reopened to the public as Landmark Center in 1978.

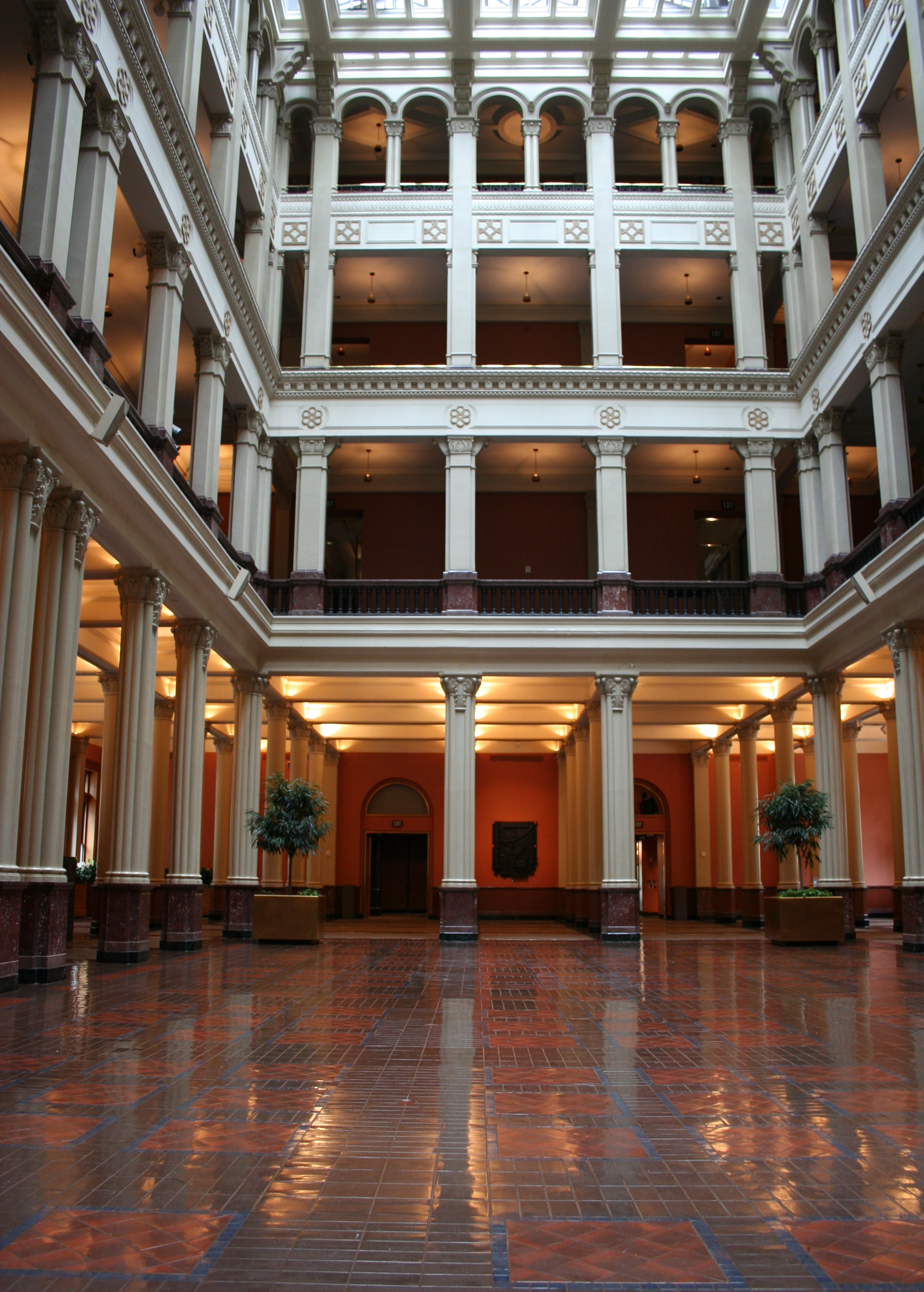
The Landmark Center Cortile in the space that formerly housed St. Paul's Main Post Office

After its comprehensive 1972–78 renovation, the center became home to many prominent Twin Cities arts organizations, now including:

- American Association of Woodturners and the AAW Gallery of Wood Art
- Ramsey County Historical Society Gallery and Research Center – changing exhibits and research area for local history topics
- The Schubert Club Museum of musical instruments
- Landmark Gallery – permanent and temporary exhibits from its local history collection
- "Uncle Sam Worked Here", a permanent interactive exhibit opened in 2007 about activities in Landmark Center over its history
- Exhibition space for music, dance, theater, and public forums.

For a time the high school St. Paul Conservatory for Performing Artists also held classes on the fifth floor. It has since moved to 16 West 5th Street. The fifth floor now houses the offices of the American Composers Forum.

Owned by Ramsey County, Landmark Center is managed by Minnesota Landmarks, a not-for-profit organization. Landmark Center also houses Anita's Cafe, Landmarket Gift Shop, and five galleries.

== In popular culture ==
The building served as the location of Frank Bass (Ed Asner)'s office in the 1974 film The Wrestler.
