= American Association of Woodturners =

Craft trade organisation

- American Association of Woodturners logo
- Location: Saint Paul, Minnesota, United States
- Website: woodturner.org

The American Association of Woodturners (AAW) is the principal organization in the United States supporting the art and craft of woodturning. It is sometimes stylized as American Association of Wood Turners (AAW). Established in 1986 and headquartered in Saint Paul, Minnesota, the organization encompasses more than 15,000 members in the United States and many foreign nations. As of 2013, the AAW was affiliated with nearly 350 local chapters worldwide. In addition to sponsoring an annual national symposium, the AAW provides support to local clubs for outreach and education. The 25th anniversary of the AAW was celebrated in 2011 at the annual symposium held in Saint Paul. The association will celebrate its 40th anniversary in 2026, in conjunction with its Annual Symposium, to be held in Raleigh, N.C. Gretchen Wilbrandt is the executive director of the organization.

== Mission and background ==
The AAW states: "Our mission is to strengthen and empower the global woodturning community." And the group's vision is, "A world where woodturning is valued, inspirational, and accessible to all."

Woodturning, which has experienced exceptional growth and interest since AAW's founding, is a pursuit that goes back 4,000 years in human history – using craft's most organic material, wood, as its primary medium. Woodturners create utilitarian, artistic, and sculptural wooden objects on mechanical lathes. The craft differs from most other forms of woodworking in that the wood stock rotates rapidly while sharpened cutting skews, gouges, and other tools are maneuvered by hand to shape the material.

Membership in AAW brings a variety of benefits, including a bimonthly magazine, insurance coverage, scholarships, national symposiums, educational opportunities for newcomers and youth, and a website where turners can display and market their woodturnings.

The AAW was founded at the Arrowmont School of Arts and Crafts Arrowmont School of Arts and Crafts in Gatlinburg, Tennessee, and remains closely affiliated with that institution, as well as with the John C. Campbell Folk School JCCFS in Brasstown, North Carolina, and the Anderson Ranch Homepage in Snowmass Village, Colorado.

== Organization ==
The AAW, a 501(c)(3) tax-exempt organization, is administered by a nine-member Board of Directors, all volunteers who serve three-year terms. Three board members are elected by the full membership each year and begin their terms in January. The Board employs an executive director and an editor, and appoints a Board of Advisors along with various committee members serving specific purposes, such as organizing the national symposium and overseeing AAW financial grants to clubs and individuals.

== American Woodturner Journal ==
The AAW magazine, American Woodturner, is published in print and online editions six times a year. Subscriptions to the journal are included with AAW membership, and individual copies are available on newsstands. Members may view all issues online. The publication contains articles aimed at both novice woodturners as well as intermediate craftspersons and professionals.

== Chapters ==
The AAW is affiliated with more than 350 local chapters, or clubs, and three "virtual" chapters. Local chapters are primarily in the United States but encompass groups in many other nations, including Canada, England, New Zealand, Taiwan, Australia and Japan. Virtual chapters are not geographically based but are organized around specific woodturning techniques. The three virtual chapters include the Ornamental Turners International, Segmented Woodturners, and Pen Turners www.principallypens.com. Ornamental woodturners specialize in the use of an ornamental lathe such as the Rose engine lathe. Segmented woodturning involves joining individual pieces of wood together prior to turning to create intricate patterns and dramatic visual effects. Pen turners specialize in making pens and other writing instruments out of both wood and synthetic materials.

== Symposium ==
Each year an annual Symposium take place. They have been sponsored and organized by the AAW each year since 1987, alternating in cities around the United States. The first symposium was held in Lexington, Kentucky in 1987. The gathering typically includes live presentations, an auction of selected woodturnings, an instant gallery that showcases current woodturning craft, a rotation of how-to and hands-on demonstrations, the world's largest trade show of commercial woodturning vendors, and a youth training center.

Symposium
Year	City
1987	Lexington, KY
1988	Philadelphia, PA
1989	Seattle, WA
1990	Gatlinburg, TN
1991	Denton, TX
1992	Provo, UT
1993	Purchase, NY
1994	Fort Collins, CO
1995	Davis, CA
1996	Greensboro, NC
1997	San Antonio, TX
1998	Akron, OH
1999	Tacoma, WA
2000	Charlotte, NC
2001	St Paul, MN
2002	Providence, RI
2003	Pasadena, CA
2004	Orlando, FL
2005	Overland Park KS
2006	Louisville, KY
2007	Portland, OR
2008	Richmond, VA
2009	Albuquerque, NM
2010	Hartford, CT
2011	St Paul, MN
2012	San Jose, CA
2013	Tampa, FL
2014	Phoenix, AZ
2015	Pittsburgh, PA
2016	Atlanta, GA
2017	Kansas City, MO
2018	Portland, OR
2019	Raleigh, NC
2020	Canceled (COVID-19)
2021	Canceled (COVID-19)
2022	Chattanooga, TN
2023	Louisville, KY
2024	Portland, OR
2025	St. Paul, MN
2026	Raleigh, NC

== AAW Gallery of Wood Art ==
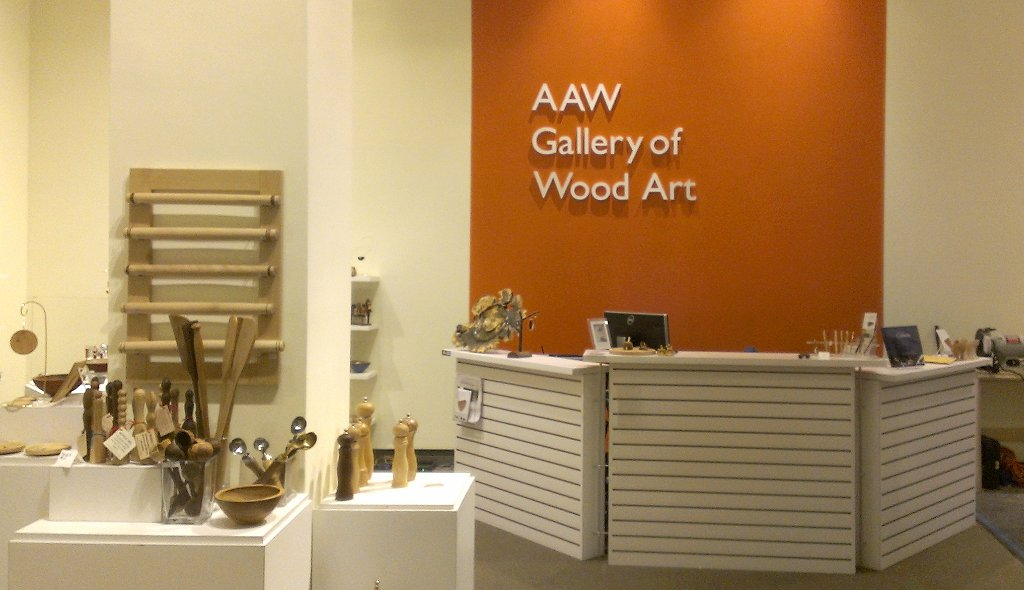
The AAW Gallery of Wood Art

The AAW operates the AAW Gallery of Wood Art in Saint Paul's historic Landmark Center. The gallery features changing exhibits of art of all kinds made from wood, and there also is a gift shop. Admission is free to the gallery, which is open Wednesday-Friday and Sunday from 12 to 4 pm. The AAW and its Gallery of Wood Art promotes the development and appreciation of studio wood art among collectors, artists, educators, art critics, galleries, museums, and the general public. Gallery curator is Tib Shaw.
