= West End Synagogue =

Congregation in Nashville, Tennessee

Coordinates: 36.13254798450484°N 86.83201754463941°W

West End Synagogue, originally Khal Kodesh Adath Israel and known for a while as the Gay Street Synagogue, is a congregation in Nashville, Tennessee. It is affiliated with the Conservative movement and dates to the 1850s.

Percival Goodman designed its sanctuary in 1950 with a flexible arrangement that was widely imitated. The synagogue includes the Beit Miriam Religious School. Alumni of the school include Washington Post journalist Rosalind S. Helderman.

Arthur Hertzberg was the rabbi from 1947 until 1956.

In June 1990, the Dixie Knights chapter of the Ku Klux Klan shot at the synagogue in a drive-by shooting, with Grand Wizard Leonard William Armstrong firing a TEC-9 and member Damien Patton driving. KKK member and Christian music producer Jonathan David Brown was found guilty of conspiracy and two counts of perjury for accessory after the fact. Damien Patton pleaded guilty to juvenile misdemeanor.

== See also ==
- Congregation Sherith Israel (Nashville, Tennessee), a historic Orthodox synagogue in Nashville
- Congregation Ohabai Sholom (Nashville, Tennessee), an historic Reform temple whose rabbis played a role in the city's Civil Rights Movement.
