= Leonard William Armstrong =

American Ku Klux Klan member

Leonard William Armstrong was a Grand Dragon of the White Knights, Tennessee's Ku Klux Klan. On the night of June 10, 1990 with Damien Patton driving, Armstrong shot at the West End Synagogue, which was empty, with a TEC-9. The two were later assisted by Christian music producer and KKK member Jonathan David Brown. He was indicted for civil rights violations in December 1991 and pleaded guilty, taking a plea bargain, in April 1992. He served 42 months in prison. Talking with OneZero in 2020, Armstrong was remorseful, stating he "was the guy who was at the root of this whole thing". He also said he has joined Life After Hate.
