= Schubert Club =

Coordinates: 44°56′44.14″N 93°5′49.61″W

The Schubert Club, established in 1882, is a non-profit arts organization in Saint Paul, Minnesota, United States, that promotes the art of music, particularly recital music. The Club presents eight concert series annually at various venues, runs an annual scholarship competition for music students, provides after-school music lessons, presents master classes, commissions new musical works by American composers, and produces recordings and books. The Museum and the administrative offices are located in the historic Landmark Center in downtown Saint Paul.

== History ==
The Schubert Club began in 1882 as the Ladies Musicale. Its founders created the organization to support recital music and host touring artists in the city. The club played a role in the musical life of St. Paul, presenting events that included appearances by artists such as Josef Hoffman and Jan Kubelik. The Schubert Club also supported musicians, including Emil Oberhoffer, who became the first conductor of the Minneapolis Symphony after being assisted by the club in the early 1890s. Over time, the Schubert Club became one of the oldest arts organizations in Minnesota.

== Activities ==
The Schubert Club presents concerts and educational programs. Its International Artist Series brings recital soloists and ensembles to the Twin Cities, featuring artists such as Jascha Heifetz, Arthur Rubinstein, Yo-Yo Ma, and Renée Fleming. The Music in the Park Series, which joined the Schubert Club in 2010, presents chamber ensembles in the Saint Anthony Park neighborhood. Schubert Club Mix offers performances in nontraditional venues. The Accordo series features a string collective of musicians from local orchestras. The Courtroom Concert series showcases Minnesota-based artists and composers at the Landmark Center.

== Bruce P. Carlson Student Scholarship Competition ==
The Schubert Club awards the Bruce P. Carlson Student Scholarship Competition annually each spring. This competition grants over $70,000 in scholarships to young musicians for further musical education. It began in 1922 and has expanded to include about fifteen categories, covering a wide range of instruments and voice. The competition is open to residents or students enrolled in institutions within Minnesota, Wisconsin, South Dakota, North Dakota, or Iowa.

== Schubert Club Music Museum ==
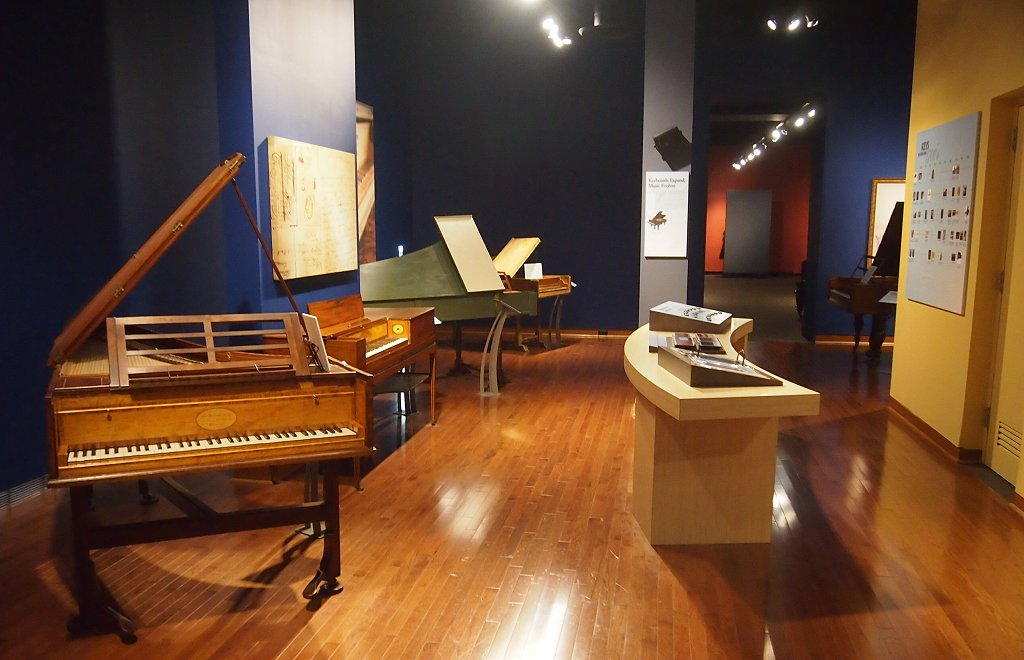
Schubert Club Music Museum

The Schubert Club Music Museum is located on the second floor of the Landmark Center in downtown St. Paul. Started in 1980, the museum underwent a redesign in 2021. Its galleries include the Music Makers Zone, where visitors can play instruments from around the world, and the Keyboard Journey Gallery, which focuses on the club’s keyboard collection. The museum displays historical keyboards, composer letters, and music players. Visitors may interact with instruments, view manuscripts, and learn about the evolution of keyboard instruments. The museum offers free admission and guided tours.

=== Kugler Collection of Musical Instruments ===
The Kugler Collection of Musical Instruments, which includes brass instruments, strings, winds, and percussion instruments from around the world, music boxes, early phonographs, and home-made instruments from 20th-century America. Originally part of the Kugler Musical Museum, the collection was established by William Kugler, a notable bandleader and musical instrument collector from Saint Paul. The museum's foundation is rooted in Kugler's extensive accumulation of musical artifacts over many decades, showcasing a wide variety of instruments, early phonographs, music boxes, and unique homemade creations.

The collection was housed in Kugler's home, where he built an addition to store his artifacts, and was known for its eclectic and comprehensive array of musical objects. In 1989 the Schubert Clubtook responsibility for Kugler's collection, integrating it into their broader mission to promote music and musical education. The collection became part of the Schubert Club Museum of Musical Instruments, located in the Landmark Center in Saint Paul.

Other collections include:

- Historic keyboard instruments, such as clavichords, harpsichords, organs and pianos
- The Gilman Ordway Manuscript Collection, which includes letters and manuscripts from composers and other important figures in music history.

== See also ==
- List of music museums
