= Spindle turning =

Woodturning method

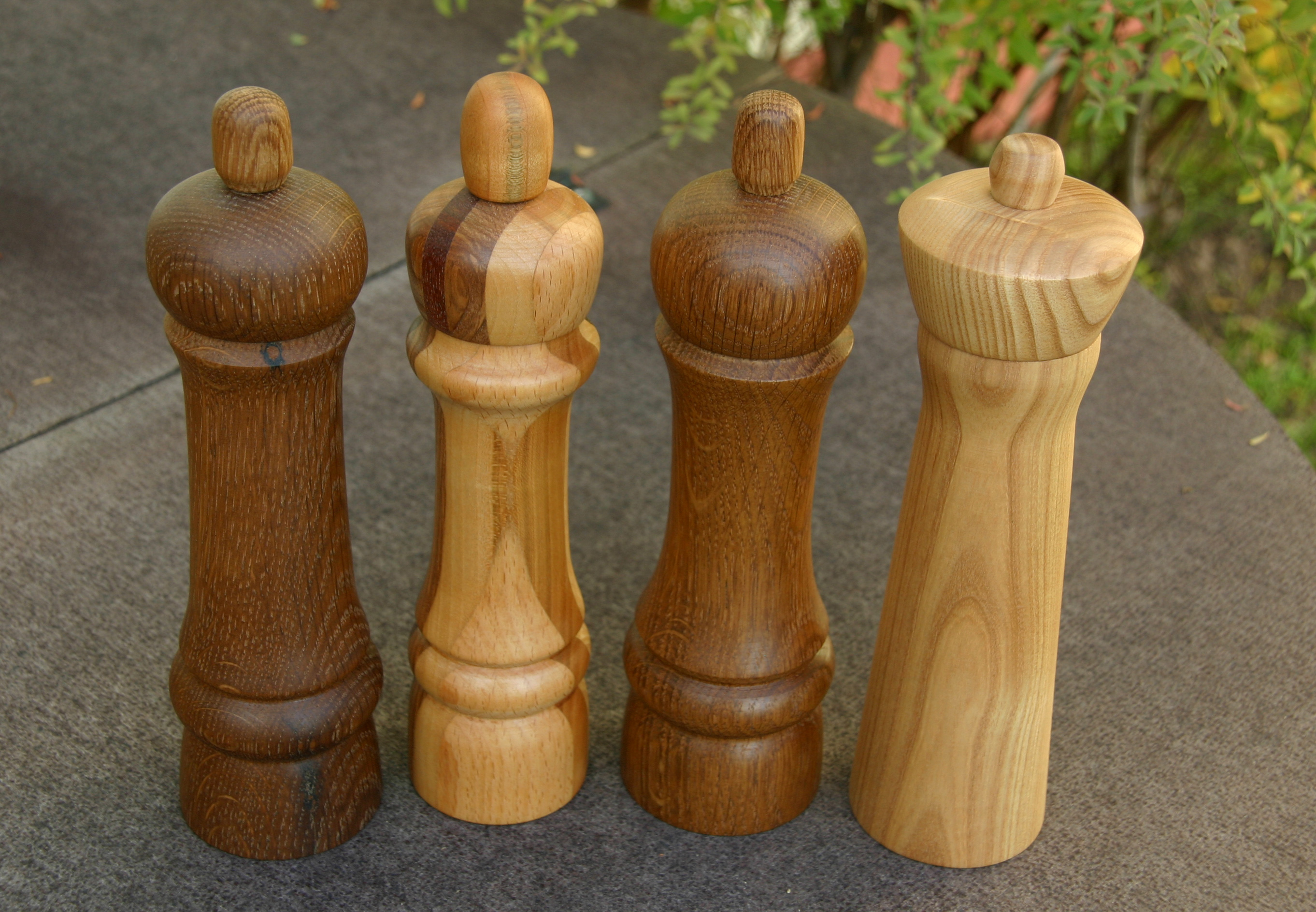
Modern spindle turning

Spindle turning, or turning between centers, is a woodturning method referring to a piece of wood on a wood lathe that is being turned on its center axis.

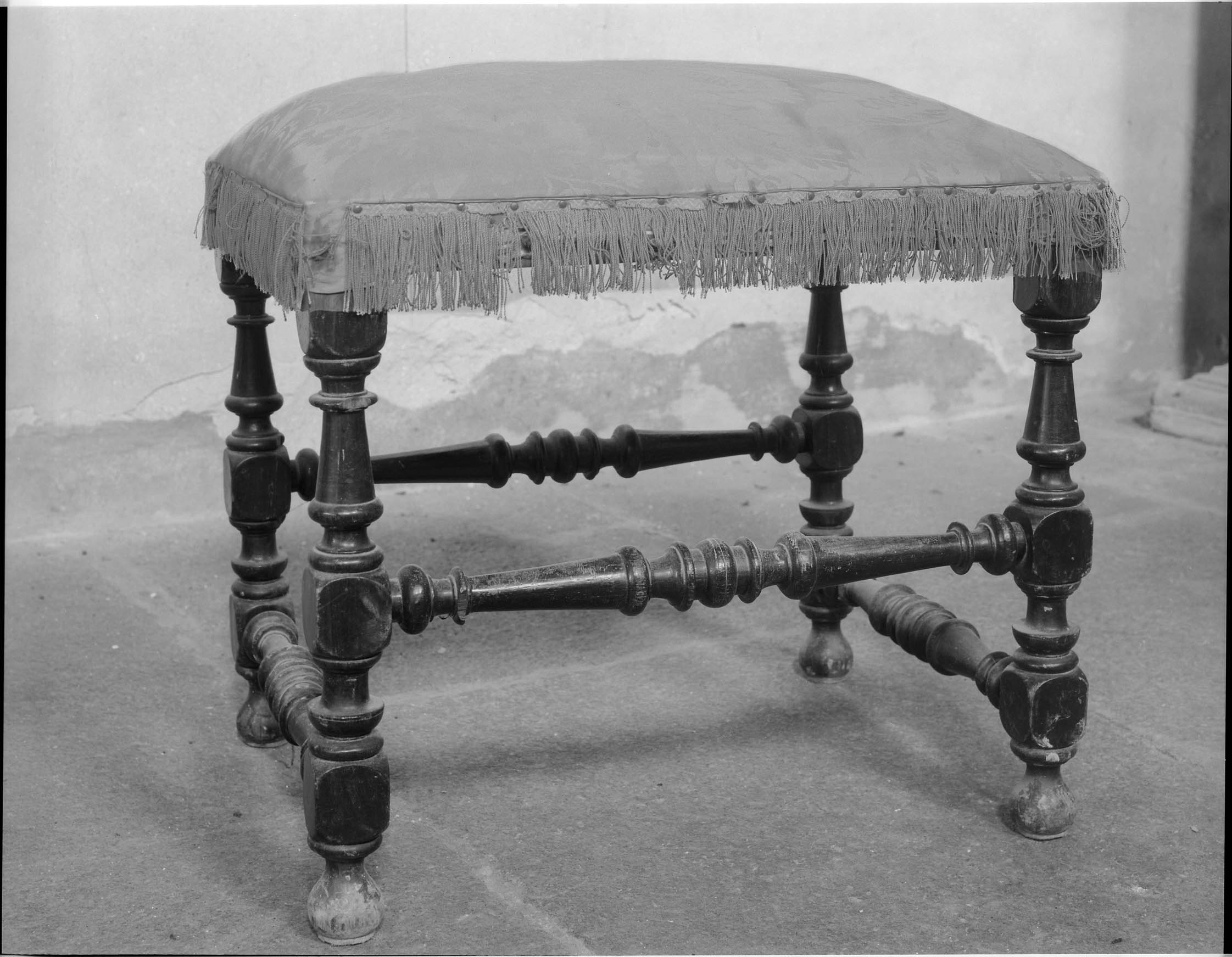
Upholstered stool, with frame members made by spindle turning

== Method ==
For spindle turning, the wood is held on the lathe either by both ends (between the headstock and tailstock) or by one end only using a lathe chuck

Wood is generally removed by running a turning tool down the slope of the wood from a larger diameter in the wood to a smaller diameter.

== Examples ==
Spindle turning is the method used for items such as chair and table legs, lamps, cues, bats, pens, candlesticks etc. i.e. long and thin objects.

== See also ==
- Turned chairs, chairs made with their frame components turned into bobbins
