= Therming =

Therming is a technique used by woodturners to simultaneously create multiple copies of spindles and table legs. Often described as off-center spindle turning, therming is also known as drum turning and barrel turning. Therming allows a woodturner to make exact duplicates of three, four or however many spindles a therming rig can hold. Figure 1 shows multiple identical, partially completed spindles mounted on a therming rig. Note that all outer surfaces of the items being turned are curved. By rotating each spindle in the therming rig, all of the sides can be turned to individual contours to create unique shapes. For a four-sided turning, each side would be rotated 90 degrees after completing a side. Each spindle must be rotated the same amount in the rig to maintain similarity. Shapes with three, four and five sides are typical. Historically, the technique was used to produce table legs and balusters, usually with four sides. Therming dates back to the 18th century and is mentioned in a letter to Thomas Jefferson from Nathaniel Colley, dated 22 January 1791 on the delivery of tables from London with therm’d legs.

Therming rigs can be made with a center shaft or just with end plates as shown in Figures 2 and 3. A therming rig includes individual turning blanks separated by gaps when mounted between end plates. These gaps result in a process called ‘turning air’, as shown in Figure 4, where the cutting action occurs intermittently as the turning blanks rotate past the cutting tool. Production therming rigs often hold 20 or more spindles at a time. An article on 'Angular Turning on the Lathe', published in the summer of 1998 in 'American Woodturner' magazine, provides descriptions of the techniques used for turning multiple spindles.

== Gallery ==
Description of the Therming technique for making a therming rig and creating a three-legged stool

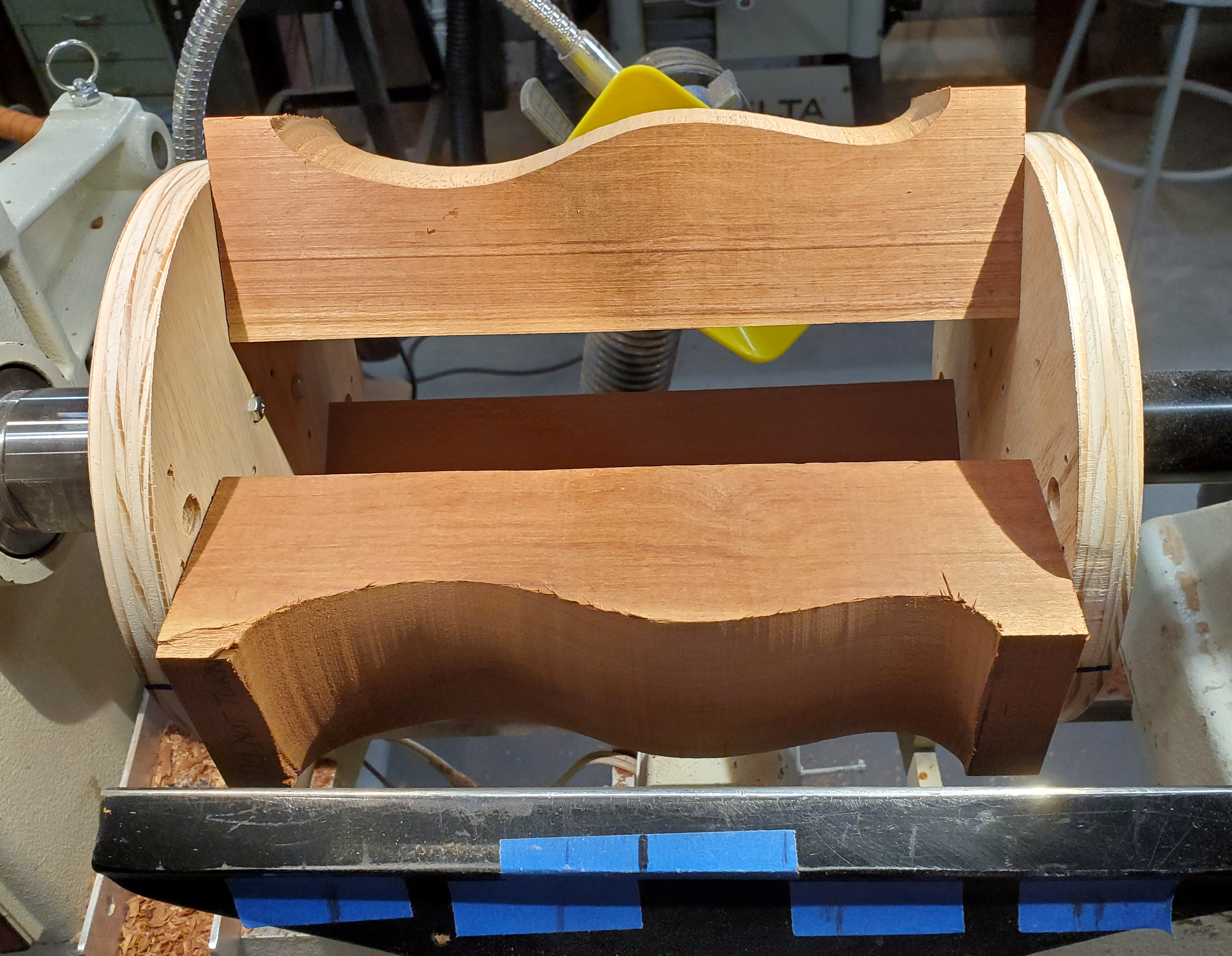
Figure 1 Therming Rig with Multiple Spindles

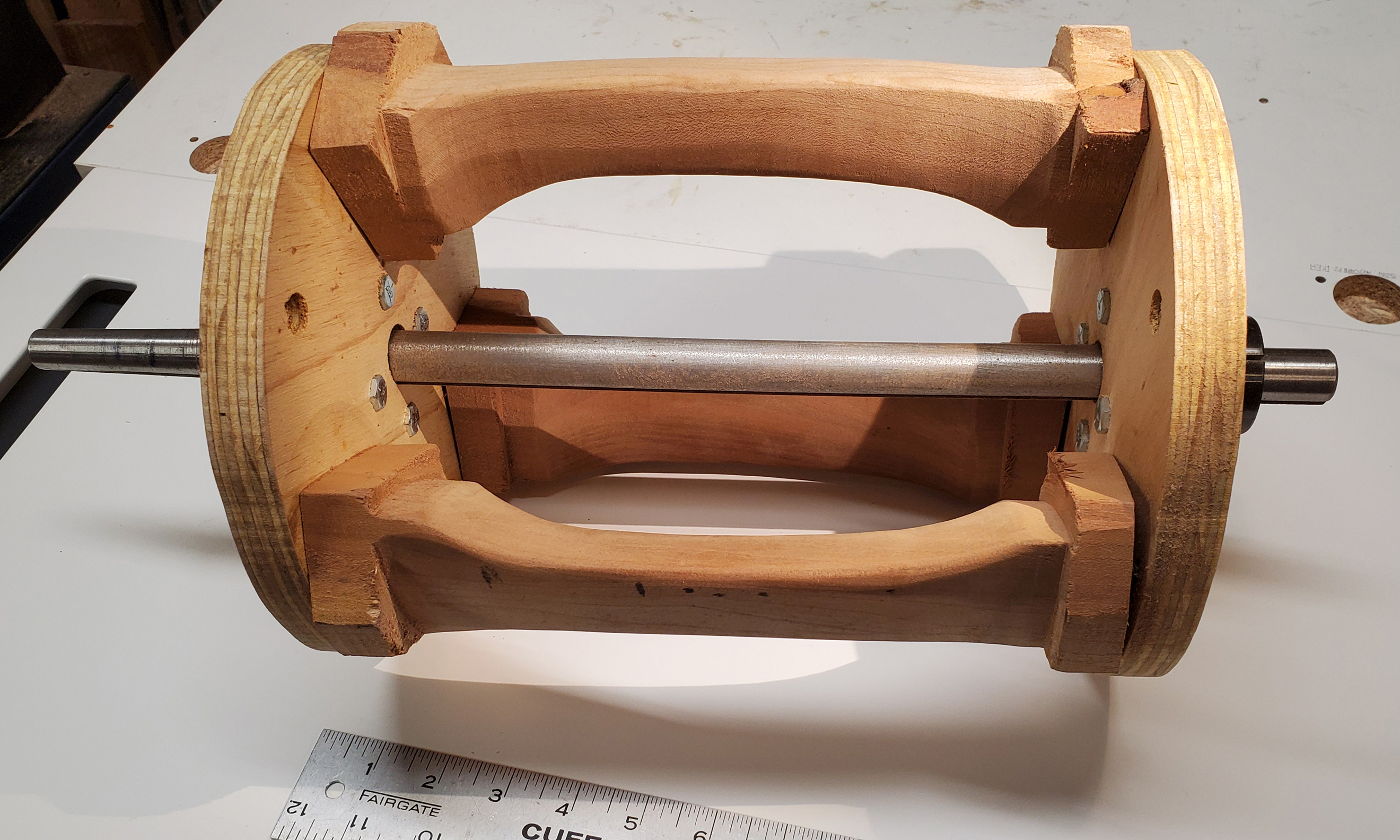
Figure 2. Therming Rig with End Plates and Central Shaft

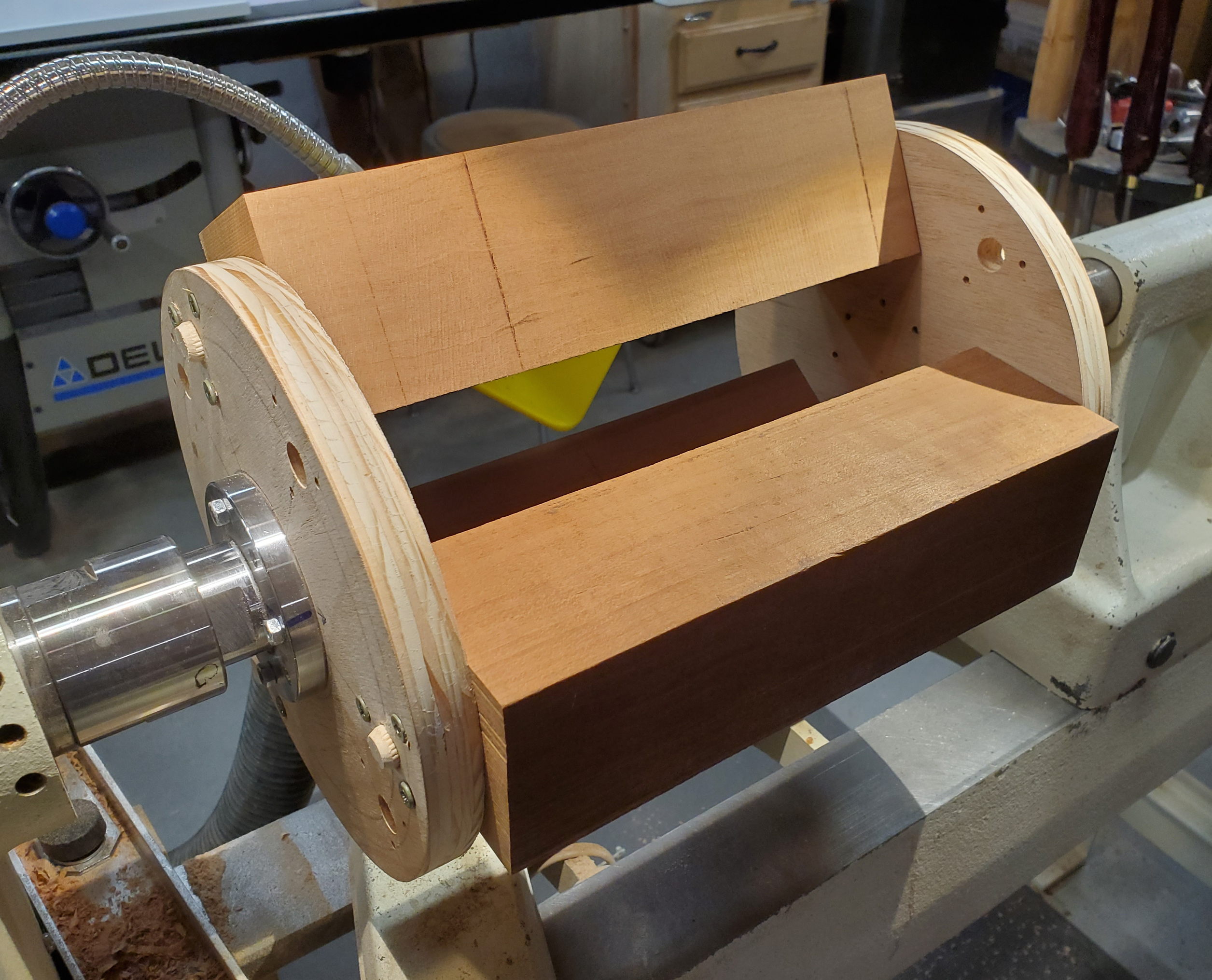
Figure 3. Therming Rig with End Plates only

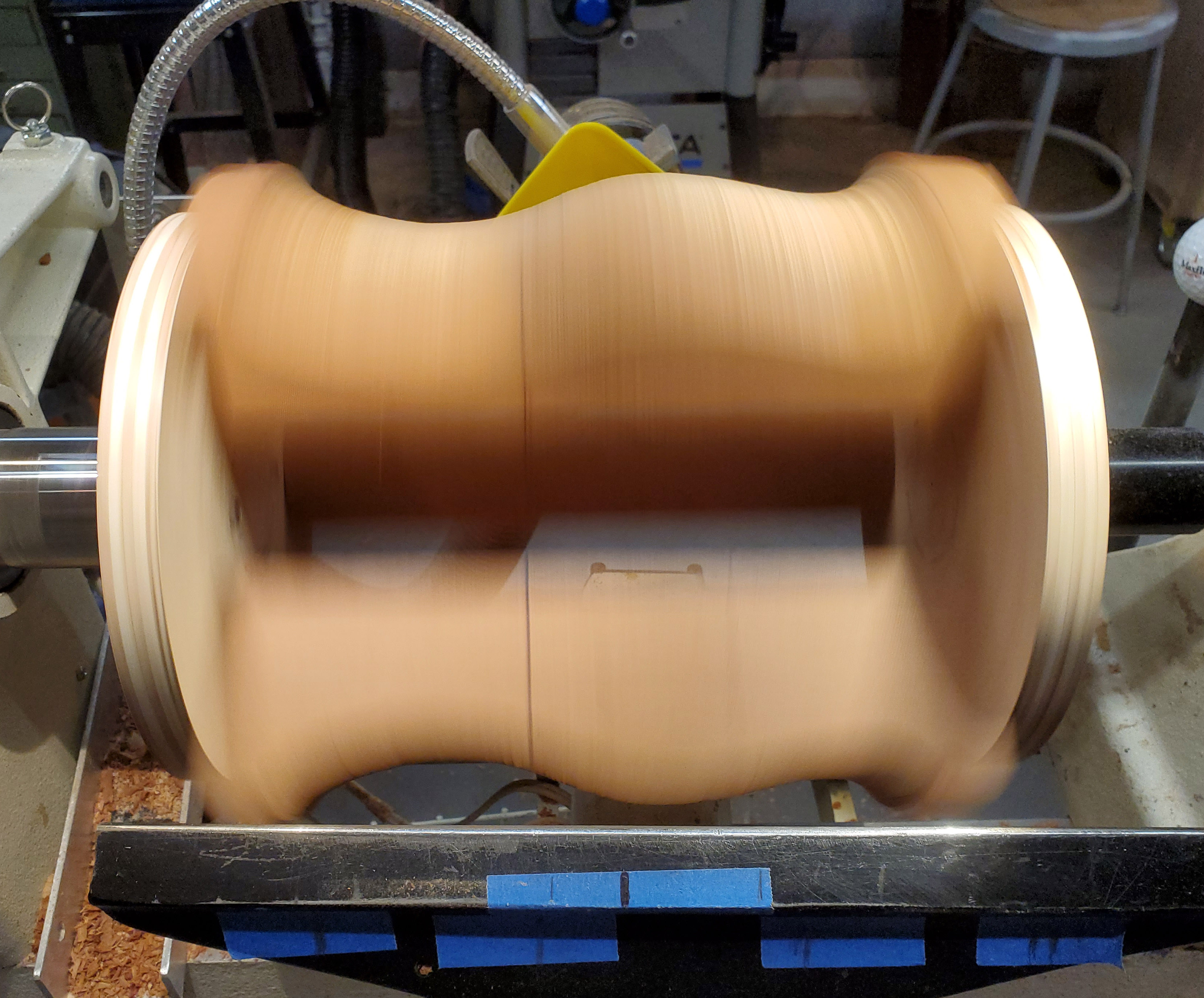
Figure 4. Therming Rig in Motion on Lathe
