= Woodturning =

Craft

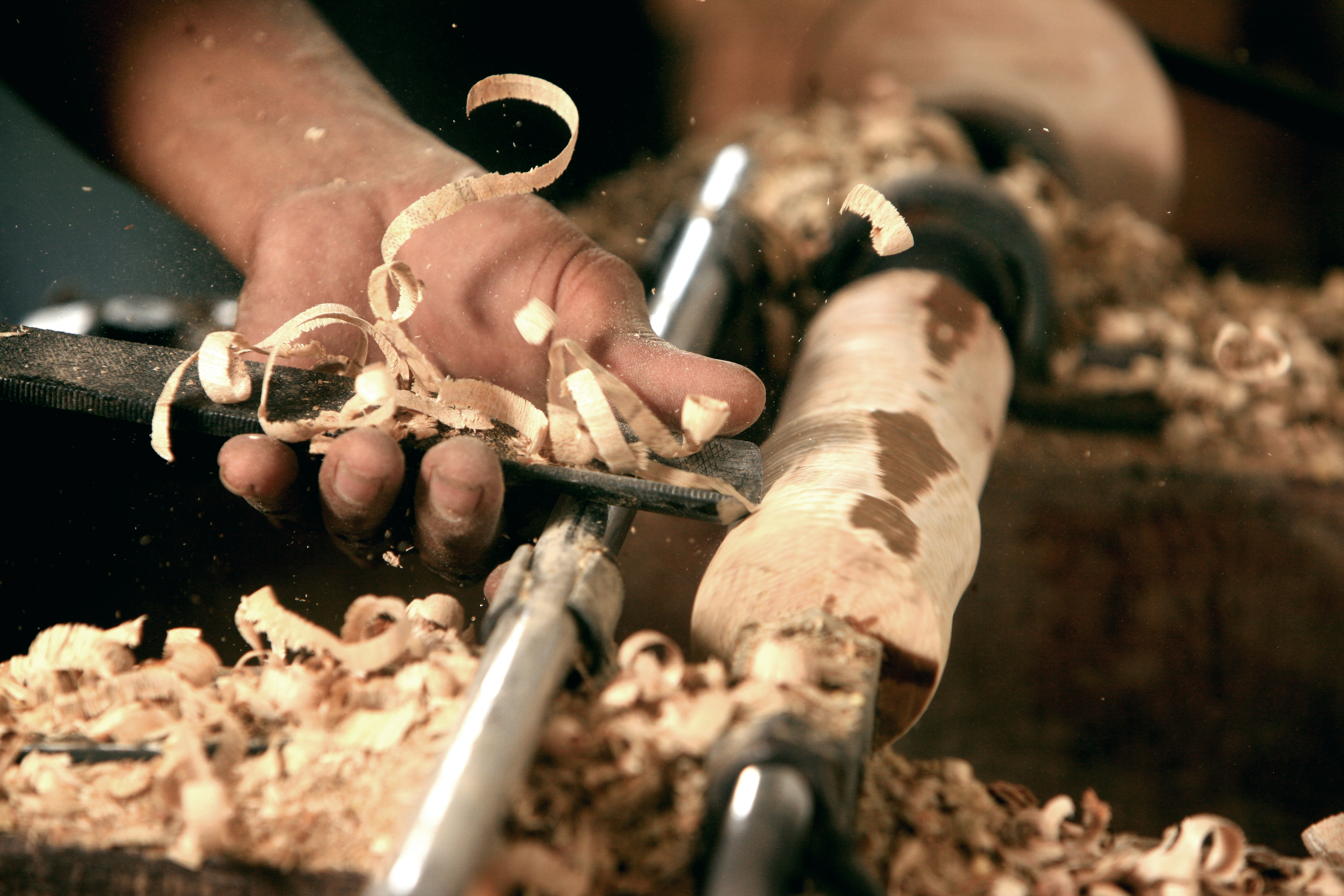
Detail of woodturning in work

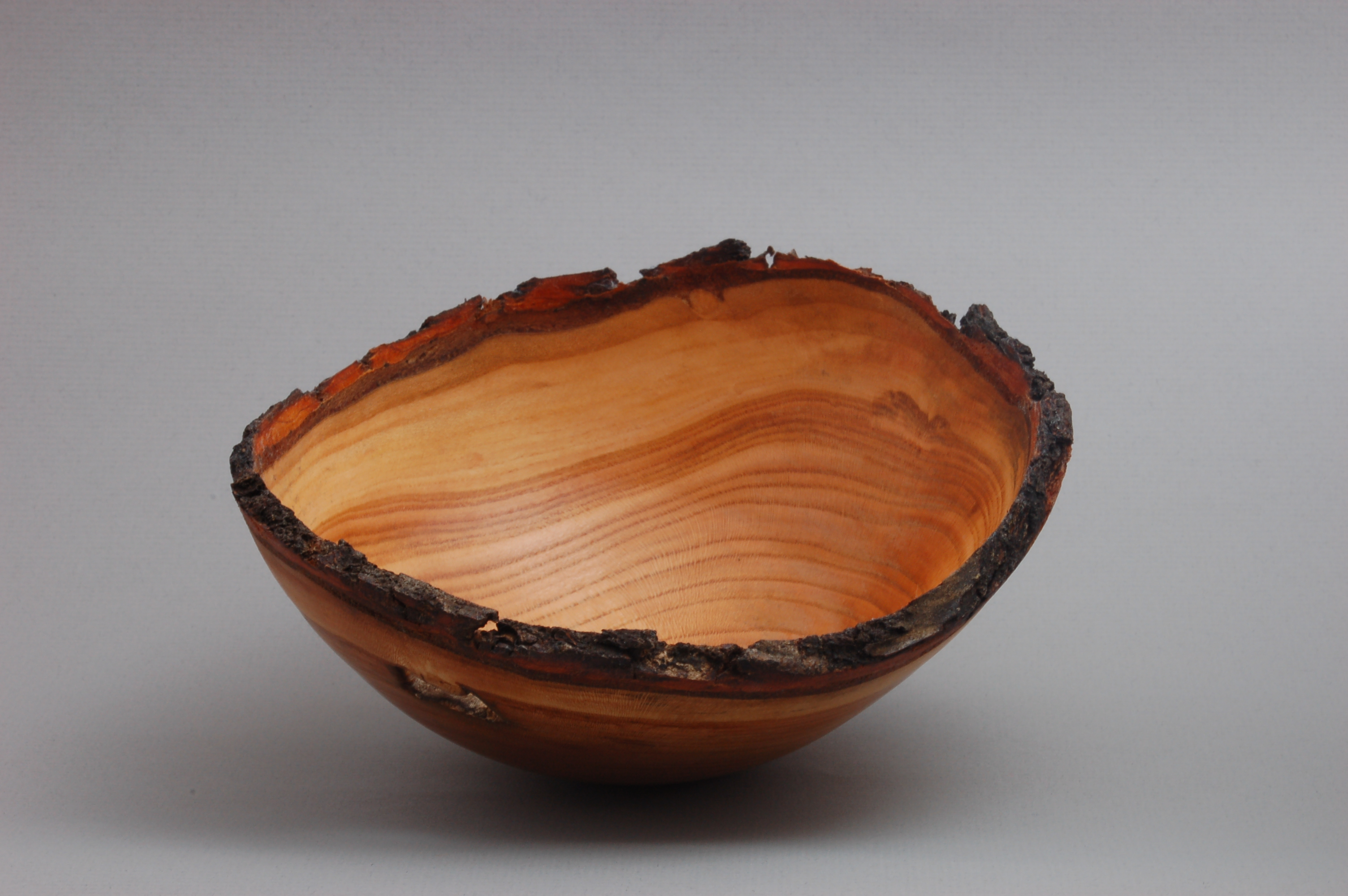
A turned wood bowl with natural edges

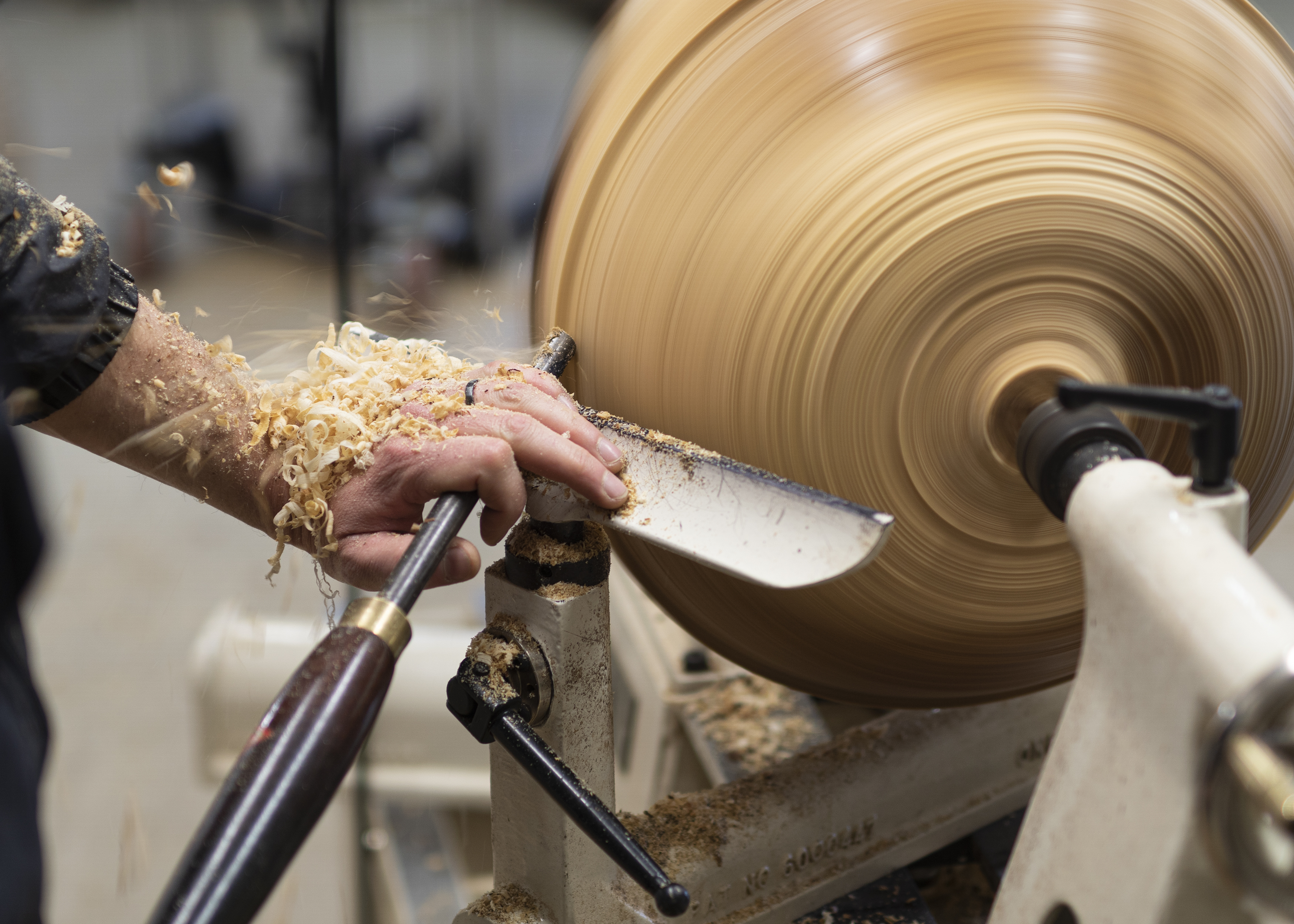
Bowl turning

Woodturning is the craft of using a wood lathe with hand-held tools to cut a shape that is symmetrical around the axis of rotation. Like the potter's wheel, the wood lathe is a mechanism that can generate a variety of forms. The operator is known as a turner, and the skills needed to use the tools were traditionally known as turnery. The skills to use the tools by hand, without a fixed point of contact with the wood, distinguish woodturning and the wood lathe from the machinist's lathe, or metal-working lathe.

Items made on the lathe include tool handles, candlesticks, egg cups, knobs, lamps, rolling pins, cylindrical boxes, Christmas ornaments, bodkins, knitting needles, needle cases, thimbles, pens, chessmen, spinning tops; legs, spindles, and pegs for furniture; balusters and newel posts for architecture; baseball bats, hollow forms such as woodwind musical instruments, urns, sculptures; bowls, platters, and chair seats. Industrial production has replaced many of these products from the traditional turning shop. However, the wood lathe is still used for decentralized production of limited or custom turnings. A skilled turner can produce a wide variety of objects with five or six simple tools. The tools can be reshaped easily for the task at hand.

In many parts of the world, the lathe has been a portable tool that goes to the source of the wood or adapts to temporary workspaces. 21st-century turners restore furniture, continue folk-art traditions, produce custom architectural work, and create fine crafts for galleries.

== Overview ==
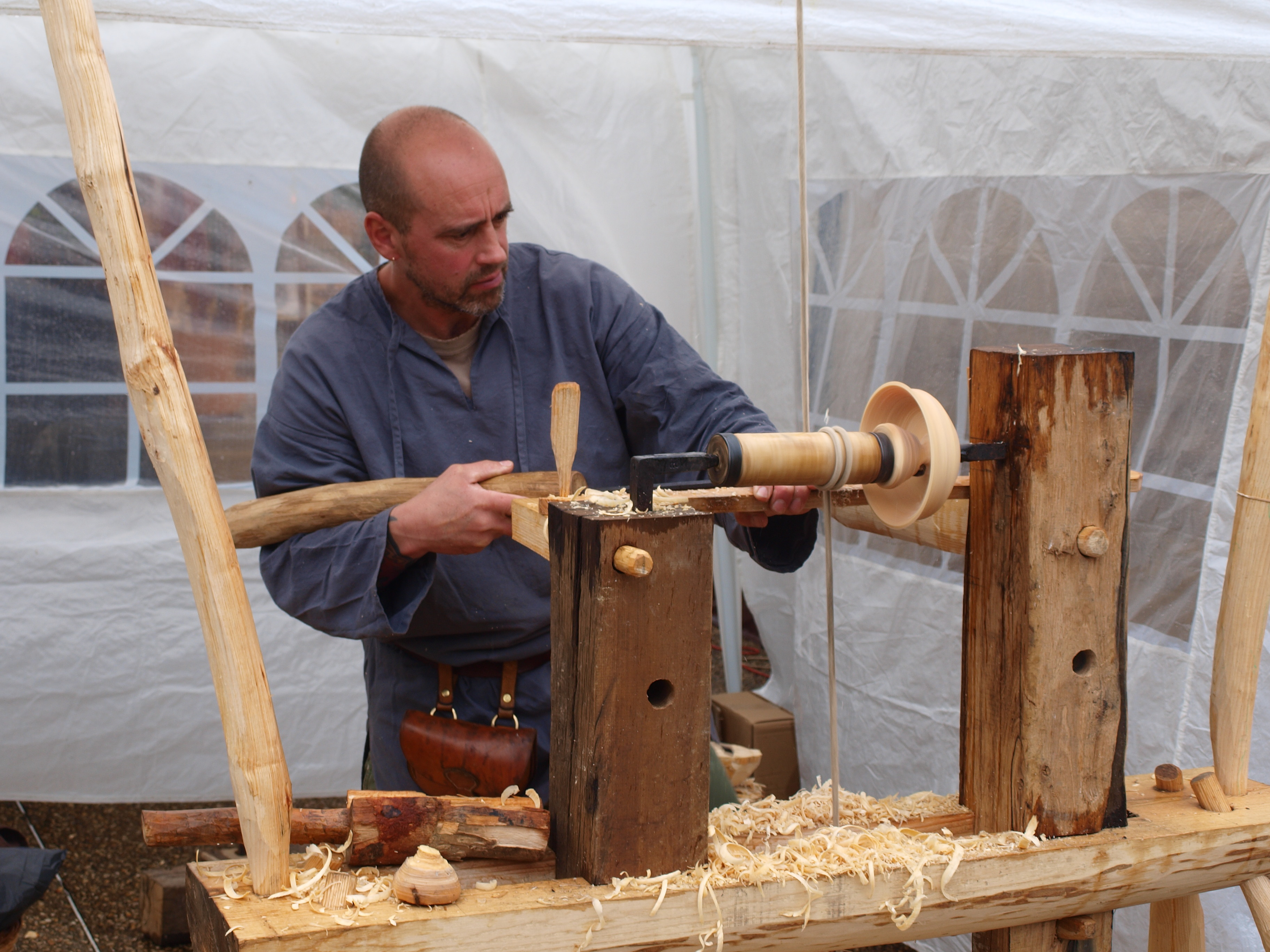
Pole lathe

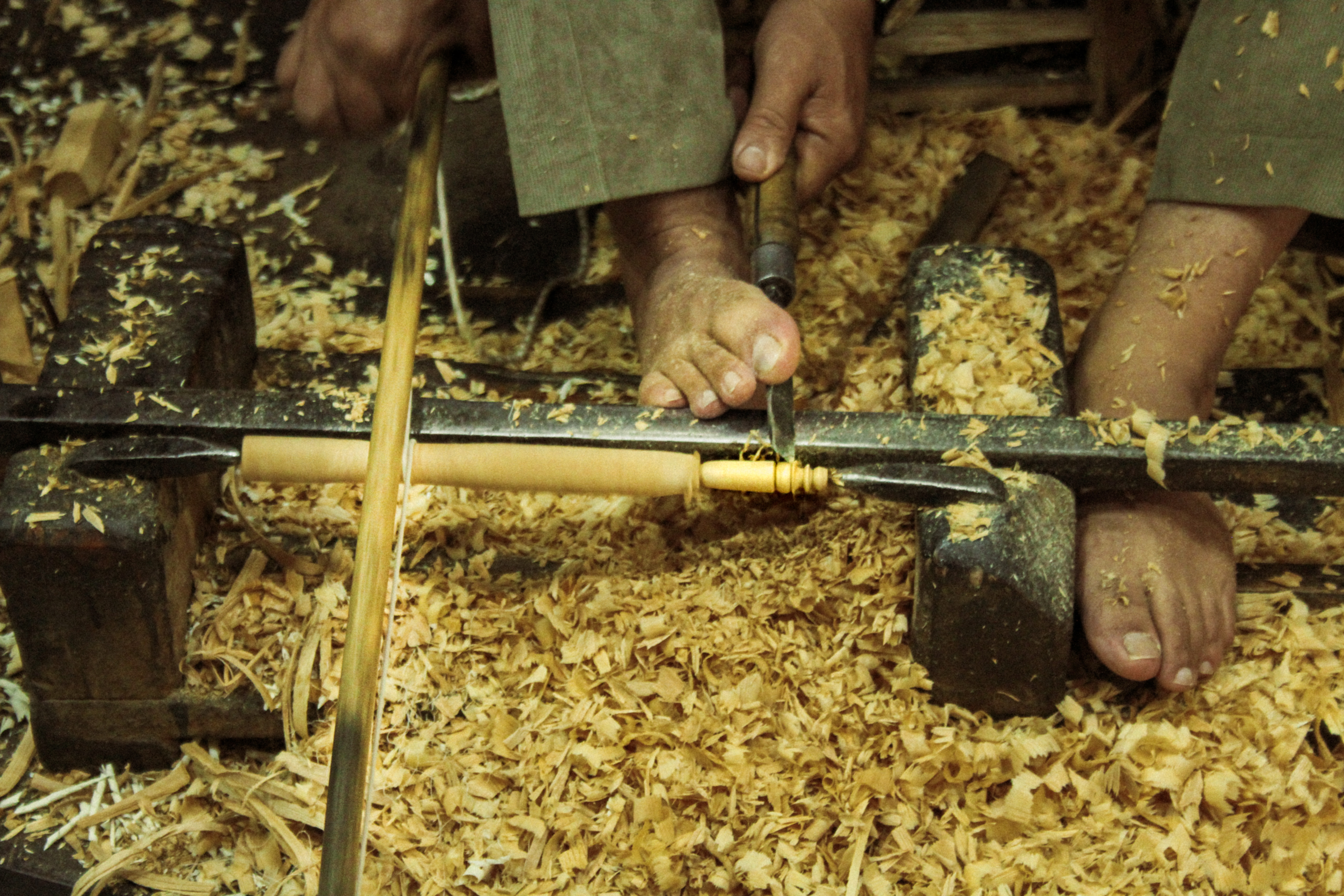
Bow lathe

Wood lathes work with either reciprocating or continuous revolution. The reciprocating lathe is powered by a bow or a spring, rotating the wood first in one direction, and then in the other. The turner cuts on just one side of the rotation, as with the pole lathe. The reciprocating lathe may be human-powered with a bow, as well as with spring mechanisms. The reciprocating lathe, while primitive technology requiring considerable dexterity to operate, is capable of excellent results in skilled hands. For example, reciprocating bow lathes are still used to turn beads for the Arabian lattice windows called Meshrebeeyeh that so charmed Holtzapffel in the 1880s.

Continuous revolution of the workpiece can be human-powered with a treadle wheel, or achieved with water, steam, or electric power. The style of cutting does not have the pause required by the reciprocating lathe's rotation. Even with continuous revolution, however, the turner controls the contact of tools and wood entirely by hand. The cutters are not fixed, nor advanced automatically, as with the metal-working lathe.

The nature of wood defines woodturning techniques. The orientation of the wood grain, relative to the axis of the lathe, affects the tools and techniques used by the woodturner. In spindle turning, the grain runs lengthwise along the lathe bed, as if a log were mounted in the lathe. Grain is thus always perpendicular to the direction of rotation under the tool. In bowl turning, the grain runs at right angles to the axis, as if a plank were mounted across the chuck. When a bowl blank rotates, the angle that the grain makes with the cutting tool continually changes between the easy cuts to two places per rotation where the tool is cutting across the grain and even upwards across it. This varying grain angle limits some of the tools that may be used and require additional skill from the turner.

Moisture content affects both the ease of cutting wood and the final shape of the work when it dries. Wetter wood cuts easily with a continuous ribbon of relatively dust-free shavings. However, the wet wood moves as it dries. shrinking less along the grain. These variable changes may add the illusion of an oval bowl, or draw attention to the features of the wood. Dry wood is necessary for turnings that require precision, as in the fit of a lid to a box, or in forms where pieces are glued together.

The character of the wood creates other challenges for the woodturner. Turners of hardwoods and ivory select different tools than those used for cutting softwoods. Voids in the wood require higher lathe speeds, fillers, or extra safety precautions. Although other woodworkers value tight, straight grain, woodturners often search out the unusual wood from roots, defects, or diseased portions of trees.

The craft of woodturning is preserved and advanced by a community of practitioners. Until the 1970s, an apprentice system in the U.K., and Industrial Arts education in the U.S., preserved many of the traditional skills of the craft. Between 1975 and 1985, industrial arts teachers, hobbyists, artists, collectors, and tool suppliers developed the symposium format for the exchange of information about the craft. This community was a kind of prototype for the artisan-based maker culture active in the 21st century. The community organizes regional, national, and international symposiums publish journals, and hosts traveling experts at club events. Most publications and DVDs are of the DIY variety, including numerous YouTube videos.

== History ==
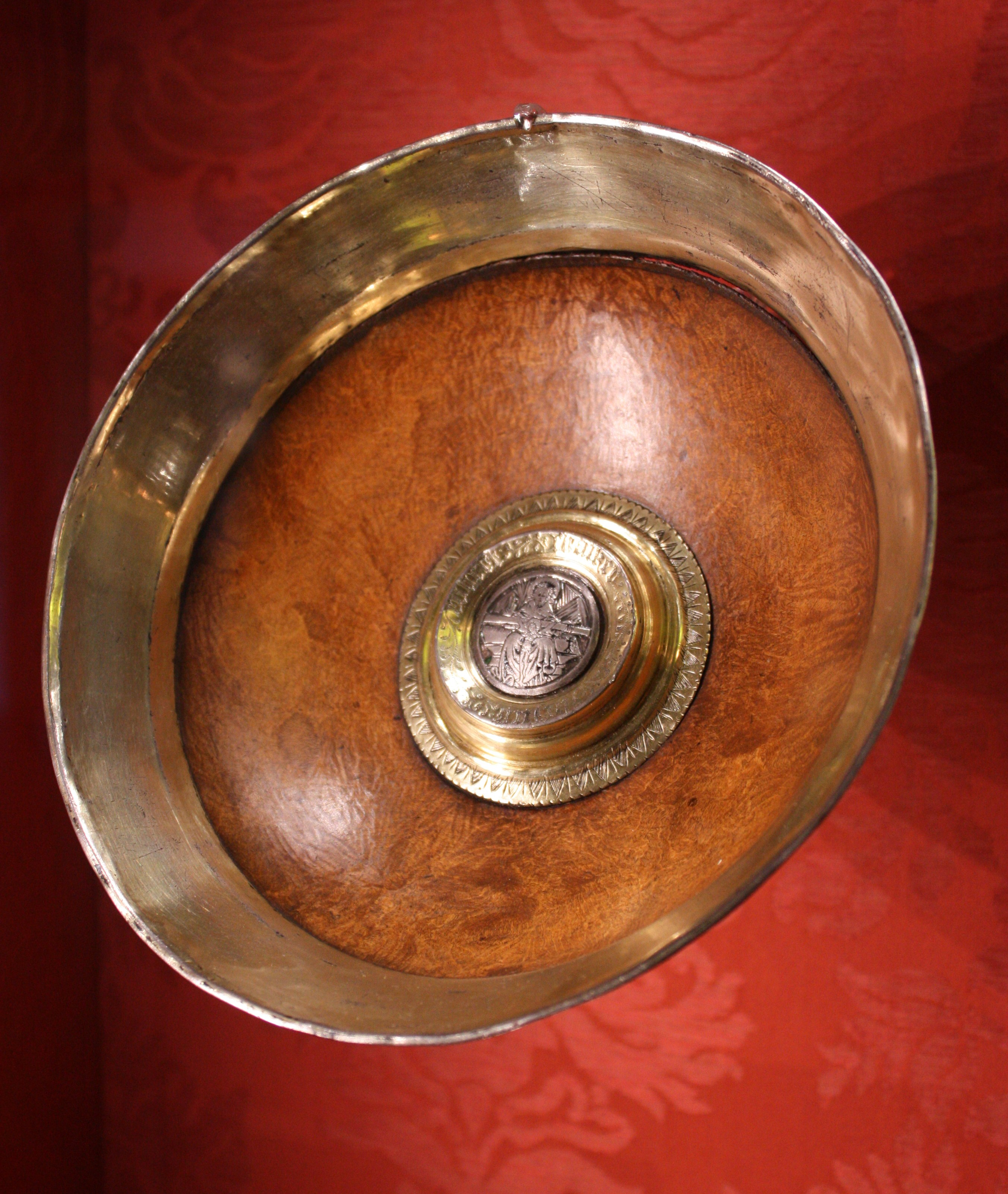
The "Robert Chalker Mazer", Britain 1480–1500, Victoria and Albert Museum. Maplewood with silver-gilt rim and boss. The boss is engraved with the Trinity, originally enameled, an unidentified merchant's mark and the inscription ROBERT CHALKER IESUS.

The archaeological record of woodturning is limited to illustrations because wood is a fiber prone to rot. Egyptian monuments illustrate a strap used by a helper to rotate the lathe while another worker cut the wood. Early bow lathes and strap lathes were developed and used in Egypt and Rome. The Chinese, Persians, and Arabs had their variations of the bow lathe. Early lathe workers would sometimes use their bare feet to hold cutting tools in place while using their hands to power the lathe. Bow lathes continue in use right up to the present day, and much of our information about them comes from watching turners use them. Between 500 and 1500 AD, turned wooden vessels served as the everyday bowls and cups of most of the population of Europe. Our knowledge of these humble vessels comes from examples preserved in anaerobic environments. These include shipwrecks, such as the Mary Rose, or sites like the Oseberg burial ship (where the burial was capped by a clay mound), deep wells and other water-logged sites (such as buried pits or ditches). Examples of the latter include 7th century bowls from the island monastery of Iona off western Scotland. Much of this ware was turned from green wood on a spring pole lathe. Finely crafted drinking bowls, known as mazers, were produced in very limited quantities from dry wood, then decorated with silver-gilt central bosses and rims.

As early as 1568, a separate flywheel powered a lathe via a drive belt. A master would cut the wood while an apprentice turned the crank on a huge wheel, often several feet in diameter. This was a continuous revolution lathe, which led to adaptation to external power sources such as water, steam, and electricity. This lathe evolved into the 'queen of machine tools' which made it possible to turn parts for other machinery. The Holtzapffels developed ornamental turning lathes from the continuous revolution lathe combined with metal-working innovations like the automatic slide rest. These lathes worked from geared patterns to cut designs in hardwoods such as ebony. They were favored as a hobby by European princes, meriting a mention by Tolstoy in War and Peace (1869).

Woodturners in London organized into a guild as early as 1310 on Wood Street. By 1347, the Turners Company was assigned responsibility for regulating weights and measures by the Mayor. By 1591, they built their own Hall. The Company governed the apprentice system and established pricing for goods. In 1604, they were incorporated as the Worshipful Company of Turners of London. Outside of London, the craft was decentralized and unregulated. Itinerant turners known as Bodgers set up temporary pole lathes near the source of wood for turning furniture parts.

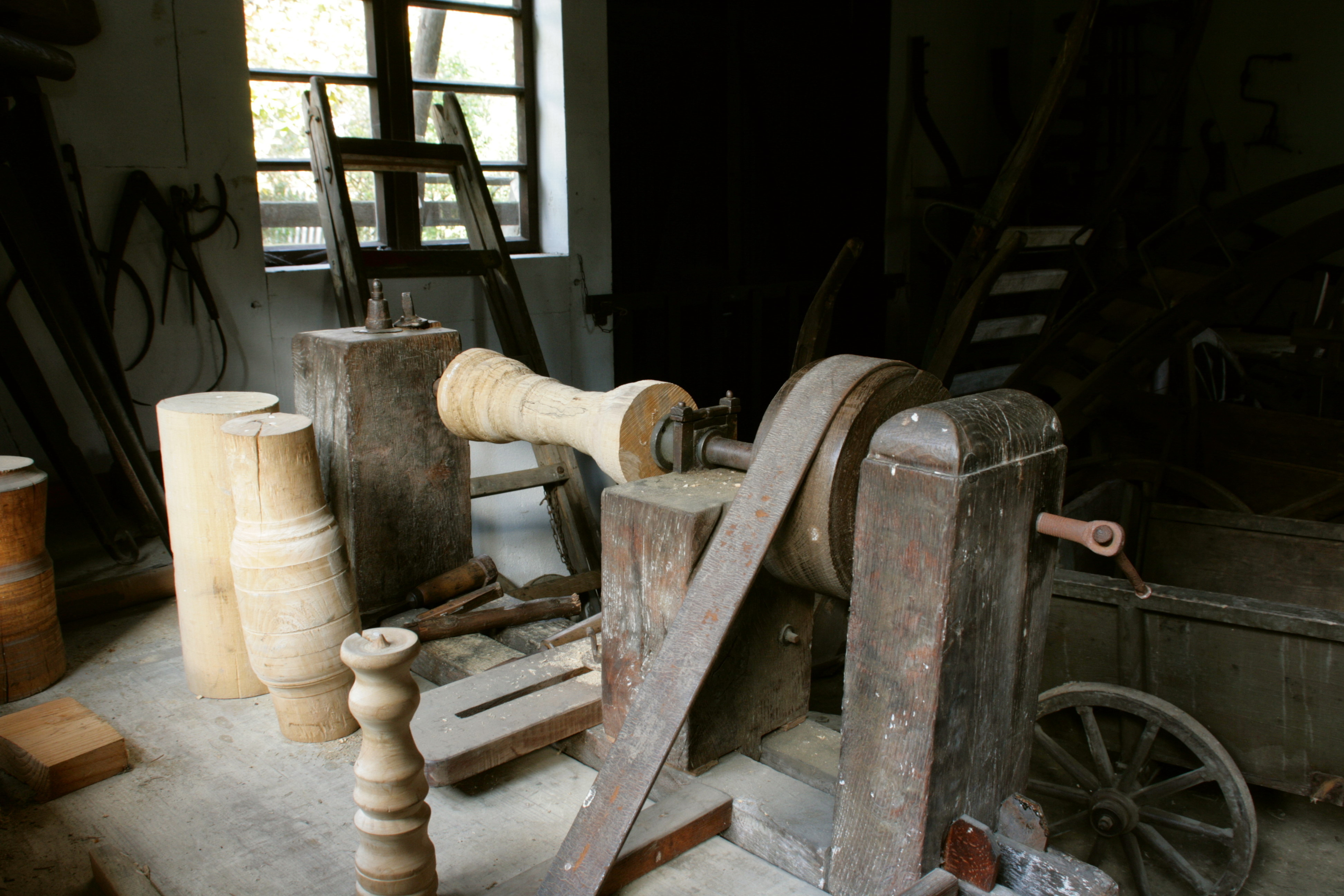
Belt driven lathe

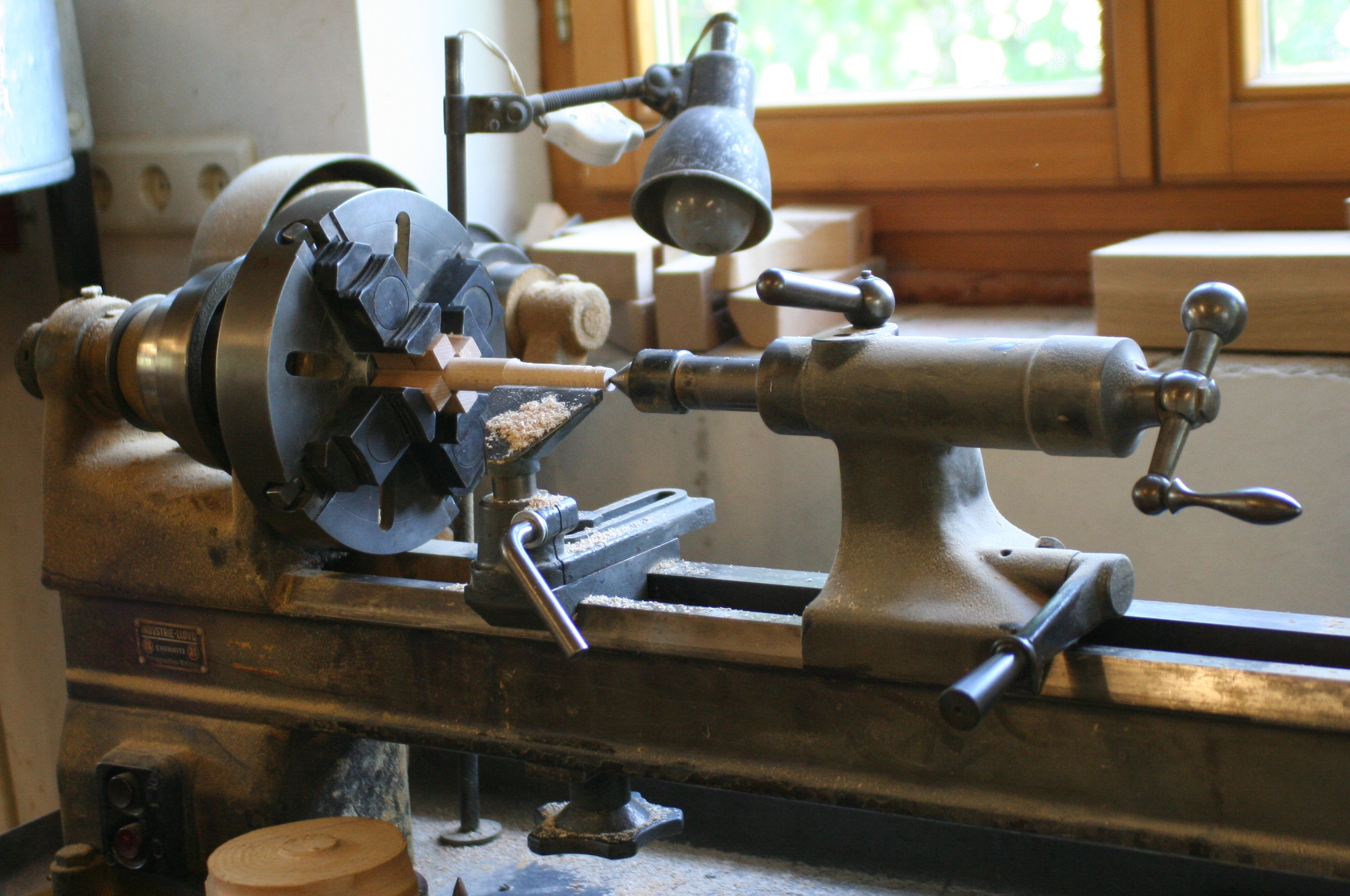
Electric lathe

In the 19th and early 20th century, woodturners in England worked in Turning Shops, usually within the master-apprentice system. In Germany and Russia, woodturning was concentrated in villages that had a specialty, such as turning toys. Bow lathes and pole lathes continued in use for decentralized, one-man production of architectural elements and bowls in many parts of the world. In the US, woodturning was part of the curriculum of industrial arts taught in public schools—often a prerequisite for classes in building furniture. The 'problems' from textbooks included both tool management skills, and assignments to turn objects such as gavels, darning eggs, boxes, trays, candlesticks, lamps, and legs for furniture.

Woodturning skills were used by patternmakers in the making of prototypes and shapes for casting molds used in foundries during the 19th and 20th centuries. They worked very slowly to achieve precision, using enormous pattern maker lathes and slow-cutting scraping tools.

Woodturning has always had a strong hobbyist presence. In the 1970s, an explosion of interest in hobby woodturning in the English-speaking world sparked a revival in the craft. Dr. Dale Nish traveled to England to recruit teachers, tools, and techniques from the last of the apprentice-trained woodturners. A few years later, Canadian Stephen Hogbin spent a year in Australia, pushing the limits of the craft through changes in scale and design. Industrial arts teachers used their institutional affiliation to create seminars, publish books, and foster research. The tool industry identified a new market for lathes and turning tools. A small group of serious collectors invested in the increasingly sculptural explorations of woodturners. Unusually, woodturning never established a strong foothold in university departments of art and design. Instead, practitioners of the craft have become adept at learning from demonstrations, private classes, regional meetings, their own published journals, and internet technologies. Some artists began as woodturners, and moved into more sculptural work, experimenting with super object forms and other fine craft concepts. The Center for Art in Wood, founded in 1986 as The Wood Turning Center, houses a collection in Philadelphia with over 1,000 objects from international artists as well as a research library and gallery. Other turners have chosen an artisan-based focus on traditional work, custom work, and the pleasure of studio practice.

== Techniques ==
Complex forms made on a wood lathe develop from surprisingly few types of cuts: parting, planing, bead, cove, and hollowing. Parting separates the wood from the holding device or establishes depth cuts. Planning is done with a tool in which the bevel below the cutting edge supports wood fibers, just as in a typical wood planer. Beads are a convex shape relative to the cylinder, and coves are concave shape. Hollowing techniques are a combination of drilling and scooping out materials. The woodturner is at liberty to choose from a variety of tools for all of these techniques, and the quality of the cuts improves with practice wielding the tool selected. Turners rely upon three points of contact making any type of cut: the tool presses down on the tool rest, and against the woodturner's body before contacting the surface of the wood, most often with a bevel edge riding the surface of the wood. The objective is to position the tool correctly so that the wood comes around to the cutting edge, generating a thin shaving without chipping or tearing out sections of the wood. Woodturners prefer to use very clean cuts to minimize the time spent with abrasives. When it is necessary to sand the piece, they do so on the lathe, using abrasives held by a hand, in an inertial sander that revolves with the wood's rotation, or with power tools—drills or right-angle drills. The lathe also becomes a useful holding device for carving, burning, texturing, coloring, and finishing the form.

== Holding devices ==
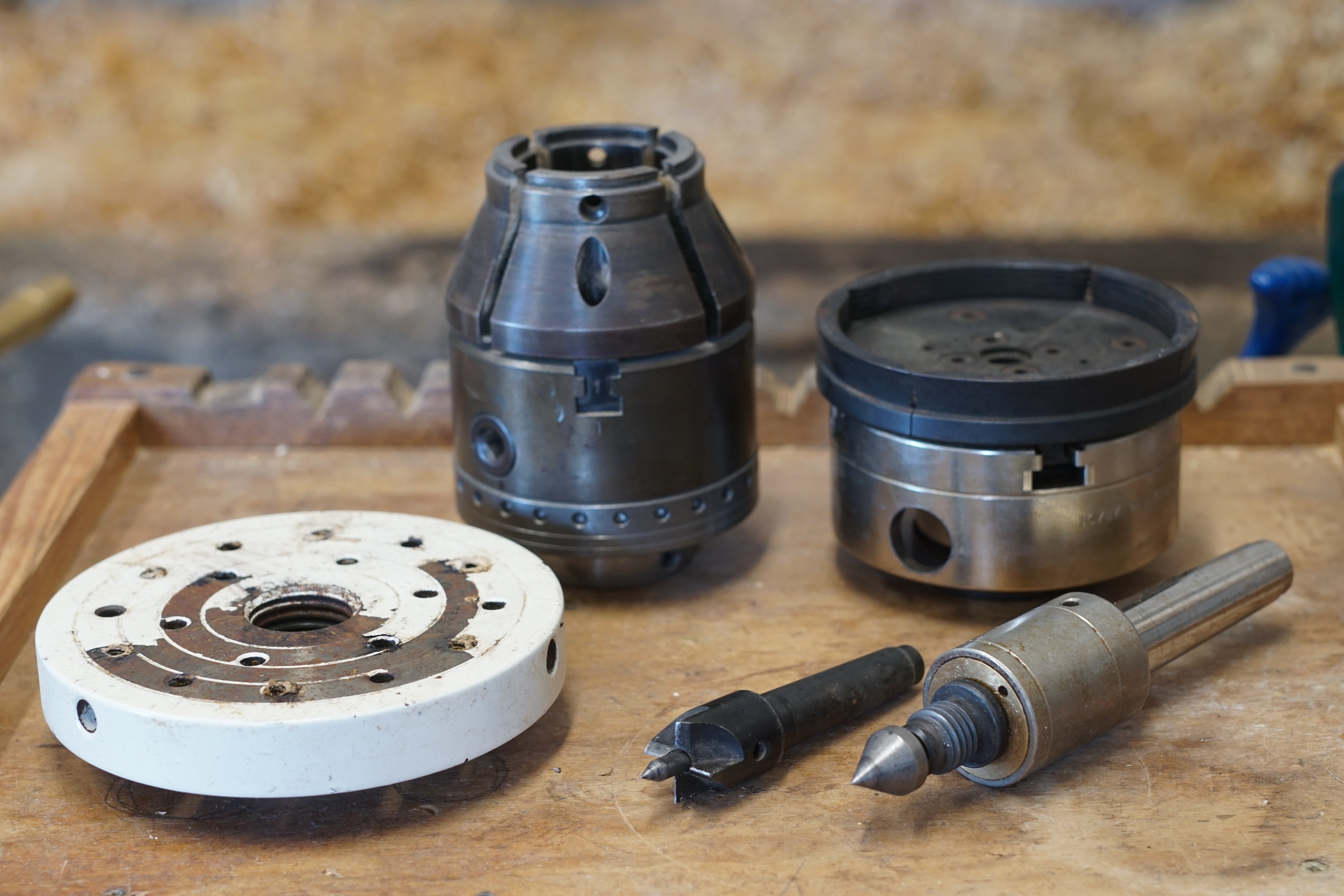
A set of modern holding devices

The wood rotates between the headstock of the lathe which includes the drive mechanism and the tailstock support, which only rotates if its center is 'live' or supported by a rotating holding device. The headstock end may use points or spurs which are driven into the wood. This type of turning is described as 'between centers.' The headstock spindle may also use a cup, collet, or scroll chuck to hold a tenon on the workpiece which will be removed in the finished product. The wood can also be screwed or glued to a faceplate—a strong disk that is threaded to mount on the headstock's spindle. The use of a chuck or faceplate allows the woodturner to forego tailstock support for the rotating wood. This type of secure holding system is essential for hollowing bowls or hollow forms.

== Tools ==
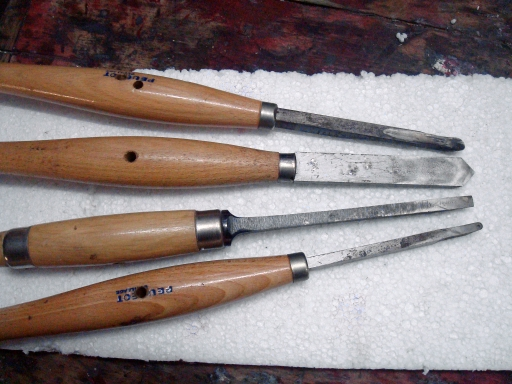
A basic set of tools for woodturning

Turning tools are generally made from carbon steel, high-speed steel (HSS), and more recently tungsten carbide. Comparing the three types, high-speed steel tools maintain their edge longer, requiring less frequent sharpening than carbon steel, but not as long as tungsten carbide. Tungsten carbide tools typically consist of scraping tools with the disposable carbide insert attached to the tool. The harder the type of high-speed steel used, the longer the edge will maintain sharpness. Tungsten carbide inserts are generally thought of as disposable, but they can be sharpened with diamond abrasives. Modern cutting and scraping tools can also be coated with titanium nitride to improve wear characteristics.

Woodturning tools must be sharpened more frequently than other edged woodworking tools to maintain a clean cut because the wood passes at great speed. Sharpening is usually accomplished with the aid of mechanical devices such as powered sharpening wheels and abrasives. This sharpening process requires either skill of the craftsman, or one of the many available sharpening jigs, which facilitate maintaining a specific bevel on the tool. As with any mechanical sharpening method, overheating or blueing is a danger to be avoided as it will ruin the steel's temper, rendering the steel too soft to maintain a sharp edge. When this happens, the blued area must then be ground away to expose fresh steel and the tool must then have the bevel reestablished and the edge re-honed. High-speed steel is not prone to blueing (overheating) whereas carbon steel blues easily, requiring frequent quenching in water or oil to avoid losing temper.

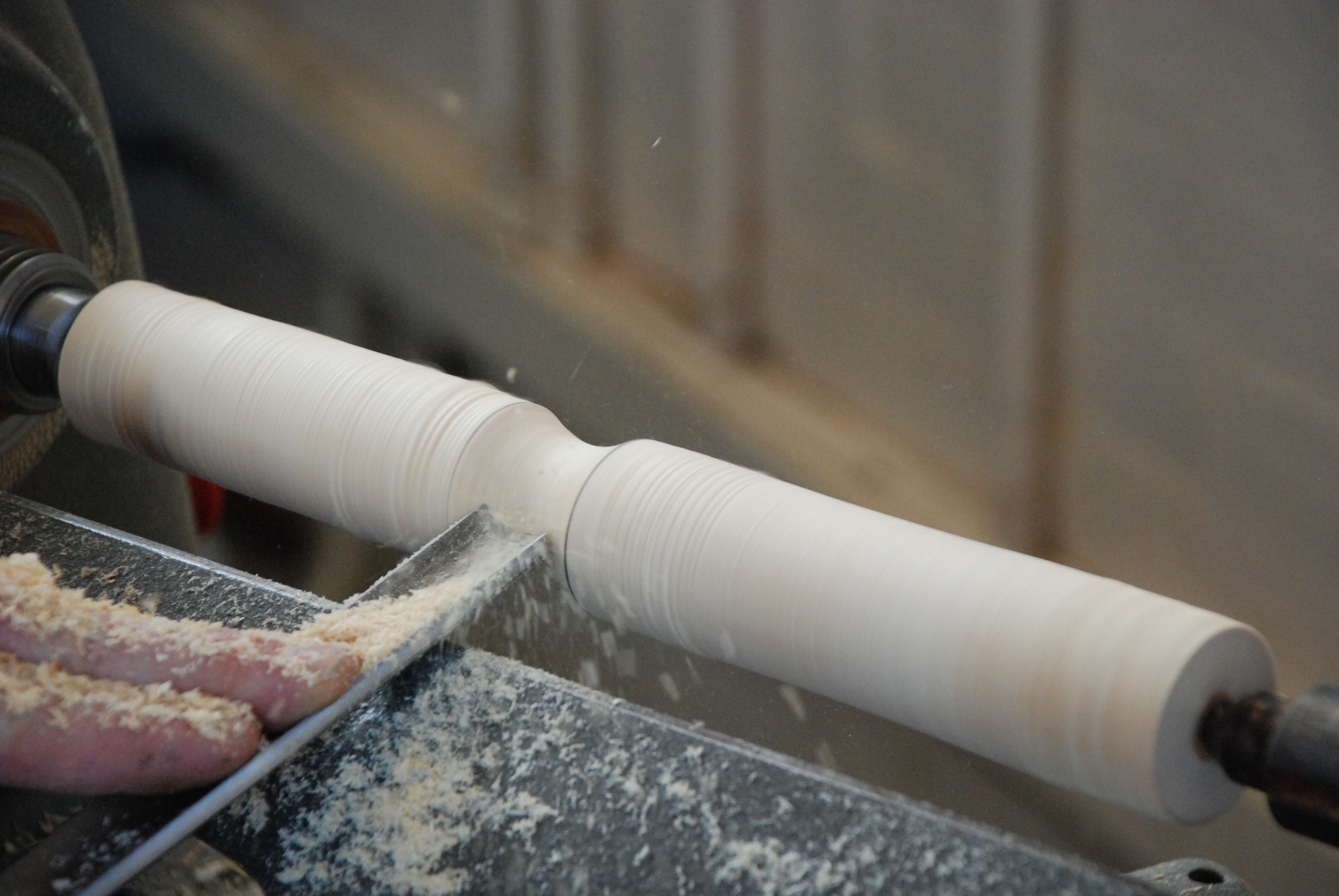
A gouge in use

Types

- spindle roughing gouge – a wide fluted gouge used to initially round a wooden spindle, and to roughly shape it. Generally not intended for cutting end grain due to the large cut it takes and the relatively weak tang connecting the blade to the handle. Unsafe for making bowls or any faceplate work.
- spindle gouge or detail gouge – a shallow fluted gouge used to create details on spindles, including beads (raised portions of the turning typically semi-circular in cross-section) and coves (relieved portions of the turning).
- bowl gouge – a deep fluted gouge used to turn the outside and inside of bowls and vessels. Often has a thicker shaft and longer handle than a spindle gouge because it has to cut farther away from the tool rest and deal with the forces of turning a large bowl. Sometimes called 'long and strong' gouge.
- skew chisel – a wide, steeply pointed chisel with the edge running at an angle to the length of the tool. Used to smooth flat spindles, cut beads, and add details. Skew chisels are only used on spindle work (never on facework) and are honed after sharpening to create a razor edge. The skew is said to be the most difficult wood-turning tool to master but when used correctly, it delivers a superb finish which is hard to match by any other tool.
- parting tool – a pointed tool used to separate (part of) work from the lathe, and to create a straight edge separating large and small diameter sections – wide parting tools are also called bedans are used to create evenly sized spindle sections.
- bedan tool - somewhere between a skew chisel and a parting tool. Typically a piece of square stock with a 40 degree bevel at the end. Only one face is ground and the tool is presented to the work with that side facing up. It has a wider cutting edge than a parting tool but can be used as such. It can also be used to roll beads and make peeling cuts similar to the skew.
- hollowing tool – many different types of tools are used to cut out the deep sections of steep bowls, vases, and hollow vessels. Often with very long handles, to maintain enough leverage when working in a deep vessel, far away from the handrest.
- scraper – a tool that scrapes the wood fibers instead of cutting – these are used to smooth off wooden items cut with other tools, and to shape items that are not possible or difficult to shape with gouges. A sharp scraper has a burr at the edge which cuts the wood, only a dull scraper scrapes.
- bowl saver – a tool used to core out the inside part of a bowl, allowing the waste piece to be used to create a smaller bowl, and to limit the number of wood chips created when hollowing out a bowl.
- auger – a drill bit used to drill a hole partway or through a wooden item. For cutting the hole for a lamp cord, or as the first step when hollowing out a bowl or vessel
- chatter tool – a flexible scraper used to add decorative chatter marks to turned items
- wire – a simple wire, sometimes with handles attached at either side, to burn lines into the piece with friction.
- there are also several tool types for special purposes, as well as tools that are a combination design of the above tools, i.e. skew/chisel combinations, thread cutting tools, ring cutting tools, medium fluted gouges, etc.

== Other techniques ==
- Eccentric turning – turning a single piece multiple times, upon different axes each time.
- Elliptical turning – turning a piece using an accessory mounted to the headstock that changes the center of rotation of the piece in time with the rotation so that a cutting tool held in a fixed position on the tool rest cuts an oval or elliptical path rather than a round path on the workpiece.
- Sculpture turnery – turning on a lathe that will generate turned work that is not necessarily circular, can be any of the following crosses –sections; elliptical, triangular, square, pentangle, hexagonal, or heptangular.
- Multi-dimensional woodturning – requires that the workpiece as it rotates will be able to move cyclically along the lathe bed and/or simultaneously move cyclically across the bed.
- Three-dimensional woodturning – is where the shape produced by the lathe is not symmetrical about the axis of rotation.
- Therming – mounting a carrier between centers, and then mounting the small workpiece(s) to the carrier, so that the axis of the headstock/tail-stock does not pass through any of the workpieces, and each workpiece gets cut only on one face. As noted in Wood-turning Methods by Mike Darlow, the etymology of the term "thermal" comes via a corruption of the name of the Greek god Hermes, who was often represented as a statue set atop a plinth with a construction characteristic of themed work.
- Segmented turning – a method of woodturning where the wood blank is constructed from many individual pieces of wood (segments) which are glued together before being turned. Many interesting patterns can be generated through the process of gluing and shaping the lathe.
- Green or wet turning – turning wood while its moisture content is above equilibrium. Often done when the wood is newly felled. May be turned to finished thickness, in which case the differential shrinkage of the wood will result in a finished piece that is not perfectly round. Alternatively, it may be "rough turned". Rough turning involves turning the piece only to its general shape, leaving enough thickness so that after turning it can be allowed to dry to equilibrium moisture content and distort. The advantage over first drying the wood and then turning is that a rough-turned piece dries faster, will probably distort instead of split as solid wood tends to, and that wet wood turns better since it creates less dust. Rough turning is an inexact science: turning wood too thick will lead to splits, and turning wood too thin will lead to distortion that cannot be removed because not enough thickness is left. Once dry, it is mounted on the lathe a second time and turned to its final form. Rough turning is typically used on most functional work and some art pieces.
- Natural edge workpieces that include the outside of the tree trunk or limb as the edge of the piece. Typically artistic turnings, usually bowls or hollow vessels, and usually green turned to final dimension. May include the bark or not, but pieces with bark should not have any bark damaged or missing.
- Ornamental turning – also known as OT, a method in which the piece is mounted upon a rocking headstock, and a spinning tool is used to cut out exotic and decorative patterns. The device is called a rose engine lathe.
- Twistwork – A type of carving on spindles or vessels, in which the lathe is a holding device and the turner makes spiral cuts. The turner may use a grid drawn on the wood, or cut entirely by eye, using either hand tools, power tools, or abrasives.

== Safety ==
When woodturning, it is important to wear certain personal protective equipment (PPE). When working with spinning objects, loose clothing should not be worn; all jewelry should be removed; and long hair should be tied back. Since loose rags may also transfer color to the piece, paper towels should be used to avoid snags and accidents. Wood shavings generated during turning will need to be periodically removed.

- Eye protection is a necessity when woodturning. There are several types of PPE available for eye protection such as safety goggles, glasses, and visors. Although all of these are adequate, a visor that protects the entire head from dust and debris provides the highest level of protection.
- Respiratory equipment and dust collection systems are also important when woodturning or doing any type of woodworking that creates dust. This can range from a simple disposable dust mask to a full-face helmet with a built-in respirator. Most standalone respiratory equipment will interfere with dust shields and visors, so devices that incorporate both are ideal. Many kinds of wood create dust that is a health hazard. For example, cocobolo (granadillo) dust can cause toxic shock. Many people are sensitive to oils carried in walnut, locust, and oak sawdust. Long-term exposure to fine wood dust has also been linked with an increased risk of developing cancer.
- Ear protection – A lathe is a quiet machine compared to other power tools, but earplugs should be worn if noise is excessive. This may be due to motor (fan) noise from a shop dust collector or the combination of wood and tool being used.
- Hand/skin protection – Gloves should not be used with rotating equipment due to the risk of getting tangled in the machine. However, wood can cause splinters that not only puncture the skin but also cause festering sores or skin irritation. The polishes and finishes used in woodturning often contain organic solvents such as methanol, turpentine, and toluene, all of which can be harmful irritants to the skin. This subject continues to be debated in the community.
- Foot protection – Protective footwear such as leather steel-toe boots is essential for any type of shop activity.

A good way to check the safety before starting the lathe is ' SAFER':

- S – Speed – The rotational speed should be slower for big, heavy items and faster for smaller, lighter things. Most craftsmen recommend starting at slow speeds and re-setting speed to low at the end of the session.
- A – Aside – Stand to the side of the blank's 'firing line' (not in front of the wood).
- F – Fixings – Confirm that all materials and equipment tool-rest, tailstock, etc. are correctly attached and secured.
- E – Eye and ear protection – Wear sufficient eye and ear protection.
- R – Revolve – Confirm the wood can freely rotate without encountering any obstructions such as the tool rest.

Safe usage of a lathe also depends on the operator's choice of proper techniques for the lathe, tools, and wood. For example, using a high spindle speed with an unbalanced wooden blank may cause the lathe to vibrate dangerously. Spinning a large turning blank too quickly may cause it to explode. Inappropriate use of tools such as gouges and skew chisels can cause a catch, where the tool bites suddenly and aggressively into the wood in an uncontrolled manner. These risky practices can exert extremely large forces upon the wood, the tool, the lathe, and the operator. The wood could fracture or tear free from the lathe. In lathe accidents, tools are often torn from the operator's hand and thrown in unexpected directions. Particular care is required for wooden shapes that are not circular, such as off-center work, and for bowls with wings or square rims. Portions of the turning extend farther from the axis of rotation and are sometimes more difficult to see than the bulk of the wooden blank.

== See also ==
- American Association of Woodturners
- American studio woodturning movement
- Bodging
- Turning
- Holtzapffel
- Pole lathe
- Worshipful Company of Turners
- Ornamental Turning
- Kijiya – The woodturner in Japan.

== Bibliography ==
- Holtzapffel, John Jacob (1976). Hand or Simple Turning (reprint of 1881 London series ed.). New York: Dover. ISBN 0-486-26428-9.
- Crawshaw, Fred (1911). Problems in Woodturning (1909 first edition as a textbook ed.). Peoria: Manual Arts Press.
- Stanley-Stone, A.C. (1925). The Worshipful Company of Turners of London (drawn from records of the Company ed.). London: Lindley-Jones and Brother.
- Ensinger, Earl W. (1943). Problems in Artistic Woodturning (c. 1926 as textbook ed.). Milwaukee: Bruce Publishing Co.
- Pinto, Edward H. (1969). Treen and Other Wooden Bygones (first published in 1949 ed.). G. Bell & Sons.
- Child, Peter (1997). The Craftsman Woodturner (first published 1971 ed.). London: Guild of Master Craftsmen Publications LTD. ISBN 1-86108-075-1.
- Nish, Dale L. (1975). Creative Woodturning. Provo: Brigham Young University Press. ISBN 0-8425-1557-7.
- Nish, Dale L. (1980). Artistic Woodturning. Provo: Brigham Young University Press. ISBN 0-8425-1842-8.
- Hogbin, Stephen (1980). Woodturning: The Purpose of the Object. New York: Van Nostrand Reinhold Company. ISBN 0-442-25775-9.
- Jacobson, Edward (1985). The Art of Turned-Wood Bowls. New York: E.P. Dutton, Inc. ISBN 0-525-48165-6.
- Jones, Bill (1996). Notes from the Turning Shop. Lewes: Guild of Master Craftsmen Publications Ltd. ISBN 1-86108-017-4.
- Jones, Bill (1997). Further Notes from the Turning Shop. Lewes: Guild of Master Craftsmen Publication Ltd. ISBN 1-86108-036-0.
- Wood, Robin (2005). The Wooden Bowl. Ammanford: Stobart Davies Ltd. ISBN 0-85442-130-0.
- Shaw, Tib; Martin, Terry; Kelsey, John (2016). "Woodturning's Long Journey (timeline)". American Woodturner. 31 (3): inside front cover and page 1.
- Woodbury, R.S. (1963). "The Origins of the Lathe". Scientific American. 208 (4): 132–140. Bibcode:1963SciAm.208d.132W. doi:10.1038/scientificamerican0463-132.
- Ritchey, James; Monroe, Walter W.; Beese, Charles; Hall, Philip (1942). Pattern Making. Chicago: American Technical Society.
