= Tunji Banjo =

English footballer who represented Nigeria

Personal information
- Full name: Tunji Babajide Banjo
- Date of birth: 19 February 1960 (age 66)
- Place of birth: Kensington, London, England
- Height: 5 ft 8 in (1.73 m)
- Position: Midfielder

Senior career*
Years	Team	Apps	(Gls)
1977–1982	Leyton Orient	27	(1)
1982–????	AEL Limassol		
1987–1988	Leyton Orient	0	(0)

International career
1980–1981	Nigeria	7	
- * Club domestic league appearances and goals

Tunji Babajide Banjo (born 19 February 1960) is a former professional footballer who played as a midfielder for Leyton Orient, AEL Limassol and the Nigeria national football team.

== Biography ==
Tunji Babajide Banjo was born on 19 February 1960 in Kensington, London, and played schoolboy football for Brent, Middlesex and London Schools before joining Leyton Orient as an apprentice in 1977. After two substitute appearances, including an appearance in the 1978 FA Cup semifinal against Arsenal, Banjo made his full debut in the first team in a 3–0 win against Burnley on 18 April 1978 and went on to make 27 league appearances for Orient. He was released in May 1982 and joined Cypriot club AEL Limassol where he suffered a bad ankle injury. He returned to Orient for the 1987–88 season as a non-contract player but made no further appearances for the club.

Banjo was eligible for the Nigeria national football team through his father and made his international debut against Tunisia in Lagos in 1980. He gained a total of seven caps for Nigeria.
