= Segmented turning =

Form of woodturning on a lathe

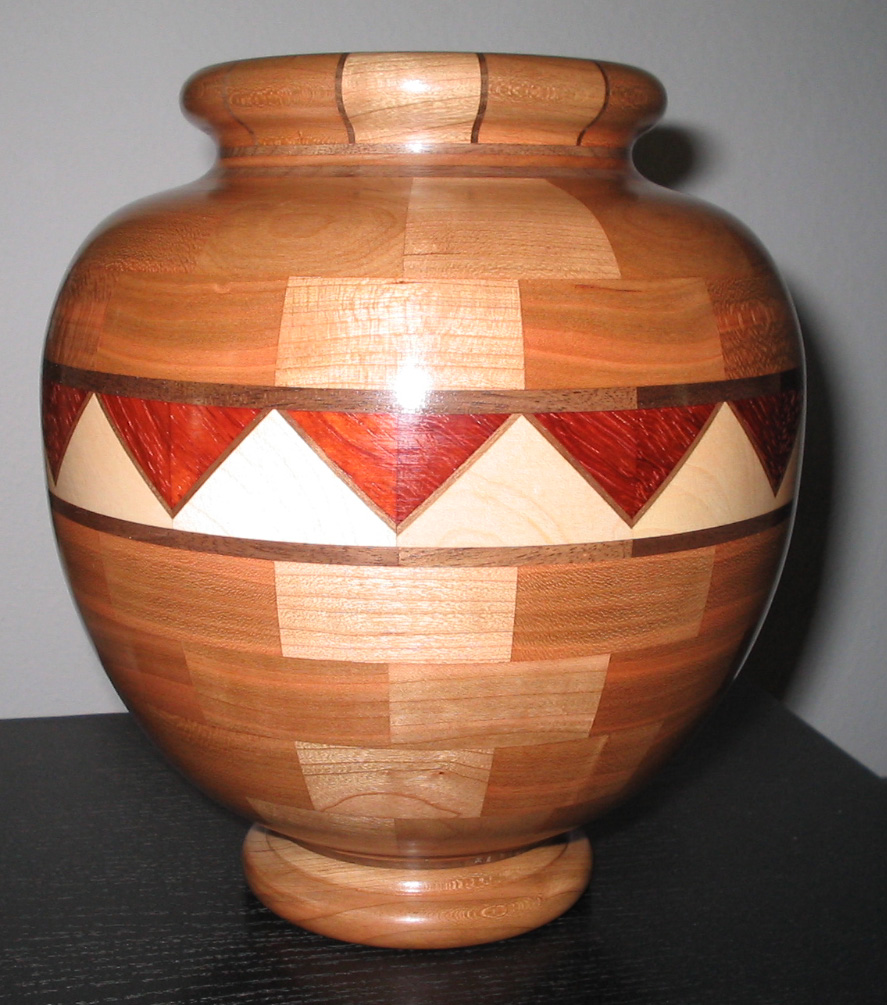
A ring-constructed turning

Segmented turning, also known as polychromatic turning, is a form of woodturning on a lathe where the initial workpiece is composed of multiple parts glued together. The process involves gluing several pieces of wood to create patterns and visual effects in turned projects.

== Variation from traditional wood turning ==
In traditional wood turning, the template is a single piece of wood. The size, grain orientation and colors of the wood, will frame how it can be turned into the target object, such as a bowl, platter, or vase. With segmented turning, the size and patterns are limited only by imagination, skill and patience.

While the vast majority of segmented turnings are vessels of one sort or another, strictly speaking, any turned object comprising multiple pieces of glued wood could be classified as a segmented turning. Examples include pens, bowls, vases, salt mills, pepper mills, and rolling pins. By cutting and re-assembling pieces after they are turned, unique forms can be created, crossing over to pure art.

== Necessarily abilities ==
In addition to design skills, segmented turning demands precision woodworking skills as well as turning skills. Design and construction of a bowl blank—the wood piece mounted on the lathe for turning a vessel—requires angled miter joints cut to tolerances of as little as a tenth of one degree or better.

== Techniques and varieties ==
There are essentially two different techniques for constructing a bowl blank: ring construction and stave construction.

Ring construction is the most common. A ring-constructed blank comprises rings glued in a cylindrical stack. Though a platter or shallow bowl could be made from a single ring, stacking many rings is more typical. Apart from a lid or a base made and added after the fact, the height of the finished piece is a function of the number of rings and the height of each ring, which can vary for effect. Each ring comprises three or more pieces cut and glued to form a triangle, square, pentagon, hexagon, etc. The more pieces in a ring, the more challenging for the turner, because there are more opportunities for precision errors—gaps and misalignments in the joints between pieces. The individual pieces making up a ring themselves are often assembled from smaller pieces of contrasting or complementary colors to achieve striking patterns in the finished piece. This adds to the complexity and challenge for the turner.

Native American pottery, basket, and textile designs, particularly from the southwest U.S., frequently inspire form and design features. These patterns are often geometric in design and thus are easier to recreate than more fluid forms found in nature.

Stave constructions are assembled like barrels—cylinders constructed from multiple long, vertically oriented pieces. As a rule, the grain in a ring-constructed turning runs horizontally in the finished piece, while the grain in a stave-constructed turning runs vertically, from top to bottom.

Another category of segmented turning called Open Segmented Turning is similar to ring construction but small gaps are left between the segments. Successive rings are offset so the segments interlock with the ring above and below. This type of segmentation seems very delicate and is somewhat transparent but it is generally quite strong. This concept was introduced by Yosh Sugiyama in the early 1980s.

A segmented turning can combine ring construction, stave construction, and solid, non-segmented wood as well in a single piece. However, wood expands and contracts in the direction perpendicular to its grain as a function of its moisture content, itself a function of ambient humidity. In this case, during design and assembly, the turner has to be mindful of the impact on long term structural integrity of assembling the constituent pieces into incompatible, non-parallel grain directions.

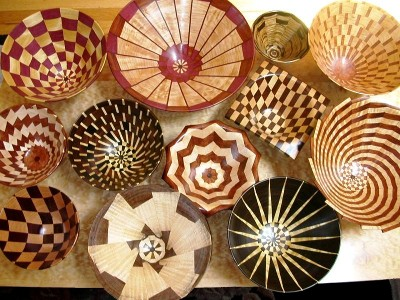
Examples of bowls from boards

An important variation of the ring construction technique is known as "bowl from a board". Imagine a flat, square board bisected to create two identical rectangles, like two twin beds placed side-by-side to form a king-sized, square bed. Rings are created by cutting concentric semicircles from each of the two boards, one concentric half-ring a mirrored-shape of a half-ring from the other. The semicircles are typically cut with a bandsaw, but a scrollsaw, jigsaw, or coping saw would work. The blade of the saw used to cut the semicircles is set at an angle from the vertical, typically 45-60 degrees, such that when each mirrored pair is glued together to form a complete ring, the rings are shaped like cross sections of a cone. The rings are then stacked to create a cone-shaped blank. An incredible variety of visual effects can be achieved as a function of how the boards are constructed before the concentric rings are cut.

== Historical impact and modern evolution ==
There are ongoing discussions as to whether turning is a trade, craft, or an art form. Turning in its original form was certainly utilitarian. The surname "Turner" may derive in many cases from those who worked in production wood turning. Many turners produce spindle work for furniture, architectural work, toys, and bowls. But in recent years, many artists use turned pieces as a canvas for carving, pyrography, gold leaf work, inlay, stain and painting.

== See also ==
- Woodworking

== Software and Instruction ==
- Segmented Turning web site for segmented software.
- Woodturner PRO web site for segmented software.
- Segmented Turning Videos: Calculations, Cutting Tips, Glue-Up Procedures Clamping Alternative - from woodtreks.com
- The Segmented Turner How-To's, Tips, Videos and more.
- Segmented woodturning projects Segmented woodturning instructions.
- /Denny Edwards Segmented woodturning videos.
- Tom Lohman's Segmented woodturning videos.
