= Bill Cornett =

American politician

Member of the Kentucky House of Representatives from the 74th district
- In office January 1, 1956 – January 1, 1960
- Preceded by: W. R. Smith
- Succeeded by: Cordell H. Martin

Personal details
- Party: Democratic

"Banjo" Bill Cornett (1890–1960) was a traditional folk singer and banjo player from Eastern Kentucky.

Cornett was born on July 2, 1890, in Knott County, Kentucky. His music was recorded by John Cohen for Folkways and appears on the album Mountain Music of Kentucky. In 1955 he was elected as State Representative in Kentucky and he once played his composition “Old Age Pension Blues” on the floor of the Legislature. On January 12, 1960, he died of a heart attack while playing his banjo in a Frankfort, Kentucky, restaurant. Banjo Bill was thought to have originally written “Man of Constant Sorrow”, made famous by Alison Krauss & Union Station. Early memories from his family recall him singing and picking the song around the house.
