= The Banjo (song) =

Single by 3LOGY
- Released: 13 June 2014
- Recorded: 2014
- Genre: House, Fusion music
- Length: 3:39
- Label: RCA

"The Banjo" is a 2014 single by the Norwegian music formation 3logy (stylized as 3LOGY) featuring Susanne Louise. The song was released on RCA Records label and was performed live during the Norway Cup 2014 Opening Show called "NRJ in the Park" and appeared the following week on VG-lista, the official Norwegian Singles Chart. It also charted in Tracklisten, the Danish Singles Chart. The track has certified double platinum with more than 8 million streams on Spotify & iTunes. An international version named “The Banjo (Cruise Control)” was released on 10 October 2014, featuring Amy King (Amy Hodgson) instead of Susanne Louise Olijnyk. “The Banjo (Cruise Control)” was picked up by Sony Music Germany in the fall of 2014 pending an international launch worldwide for the spring of 2015 after its success in Scandinavia. So far the track has just entered the top 100 on the German "Deutschedjcharts" chart in the end of February 2015.

== Charts ==
Chart (14)	Peak; position
Denmark (Tracklisten)	40
Norway (VG-lista)	17
