= Salt Lake Valley Emergency Communications Center =

Multi-agency communications facility in West Valley City, Utah, United States

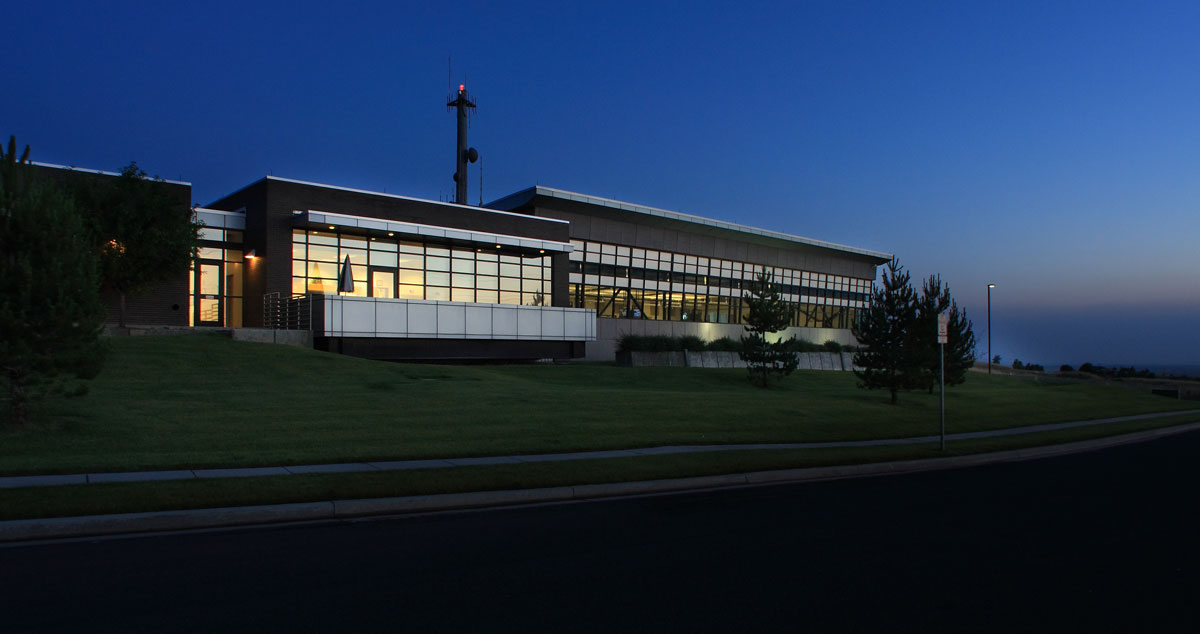
Salt Lake Valley Emergency Communications Center, West Valley City, Utah

Salt Lake Valley Emergency Communications Center (SLVECC) is a 9-1-1 police, fire, and medical emergency services dispatch agency located in West Valley City, Utah, United States. SLVECC is one of two primary public-safety answering point (PSAP) for Salt Lake County.

SLVECC was formed under Utah law by six Salt Lake area cities and Salt Lake County in 1988. Throughout the years, several cities have had their services dispatched through SLVECC. Most recently, Salt Lake County Sheriffs Office and the Unified Police Department, on January 1, 2019, merged into SLVECC, most likely as a result of the Salt Lake Metro 911 Final Feasibility Assessment Report - 2012 by Alyssa Roberts.

== Services ==
SLVECC dispatches approximately 2,800 calls for service daily, answering approximately 3,500,911 Non-Emergency and police/fire emergency telephone calls annually.

SLVECC proudly serves the following agencies and areas:

POLICE	FIRE	9-1-1
Cottonwood Heights	Cottonwood Heights*	Cottonwood Heights
Murray	Murray	Murray
Draper	Draper	Draper
South Jordan	South Jordan	South Jordan
South Salt Lake	South Salt Lake	South Salt Lake
West Jordan	West Jordan	West Jordan
West Valley	West Valley	West Valley
Unified Police Department	Unified Fire Authority	Unincorporated Salt Lake County
Salt Lake County Sheriffs Office	Holladay*	Holladay
Herriman	Herriman*	Herriman
Riverton	Riverton*	Riverton
Taylorsville	Taylorsville*	Taylorsville
Holladay**	Town of Alta*	Town of Alta
Town of Copperton**	Town of Copperton*	Town of Copperton
Town of Granite**	Town of Granite*	Town of Granite
Kearns Metro Township**	Kearns Metro Township*	Kearns Metro Township
Magna Metro township**	Magna Metro Township*	Magna Metro Township
Town of White City**	Town of White City***	Town of White City

*Fire and EMS services provided through Unified Fire Authority.

**Police services provided through Unified Police Department

***Fire and EMS provided through Sandy Fire Department

== Accreditation ==
SLVECC is one of the 11 Tri-Accredited Elite Centers globally in meeting the International Academies of Emergency Dispatch (IAED) High Compliance Expectations of maintaining calltakers and dispatchers training as well as ability to follow EMD (Emergency Medical Dispatching), EFD (Emergency Fire Dispatching), and EPD (Emergency Police Dispatching) protocol.

== Phone system ==
In November 2011, Weber County, Utah, Emergency Services District Tina Mathieu (formerly Scarlet) and two others — former Salt Lake Valley Emergency Communications Center (SLVECC) Executive Director William Harry and Utah Department of Public Safety Dispatch Center Manager Chris Rueckert — submitted a request for information for a multi-node, IP-based 911 call-handling solution.

The Intrado Multi-Node Positron VIPER System, Power 911 Intelligent Workstations, VIPER ACD, Power MAP and Power MIS.

The IP-based Intrado VIPER call processing equipment provides quadruple redundancy at SLVECC and Weber County, as well as a common database for call routing and mapping systems that displays the caller's location.

In January 2013, SLVECC, Weber Area 911 and the Utah Department of Public Safety/Salt Lake Communications Center went live on the new ESInet and the Greater Wasatch Multi-Node Project was officially launched. The Greater Wasatch Multi-Node Project includes the 9-1-1 services for Davis, Weber, Morgan, and Salt Lake. The Greater Wasatch Multi-Node Project was the first IP-capable 911 call delivery system in Utah.

In November 2015, Text to 9-1-1 was implemented.

On November 26, 2018, Unified Police Department/Salt Lake County Sheriff moved into SLVECC and began consolidating services.

SLVECC utilizes an enhanced 911 (E9-1-1) telephone network which displays the caller telephone number; known as Automated Number Identification (ANI). The E9-1-1 system also provides the caller name and location with a feature known as Automated Location Identification (ALI), which provides location information based on cell tower triangulation. The system also provides automatic call routing, which means citizens are automatically routed to the 911 center with jurisdiction over the cell tower the call is routed through.

== Computer Aided Dispatch (CAD) ==
At SLVECC, Unified Police Department, Herriman City Police, Riverton City Police uses Versadex CAD and Versaterm RMS, the other SLVECC agencies use Spillman Flex CAD and Spillman Flex Mobile provided by Motorola Solutions.

Hexagon Safety & Infrastructure was chosen by Salt Lake area public safety agencies for integrated 911 dispatching and records management. When fully implemented, the Salt Lake Valley deployment will be one of Hexagon's largest multi-agency, multi-jurisdictional systems in the U.S. New systems were expected to go live May 2018.

Due to a possible breach of contract, agencies decided to halt integration of Hexagon's product, until legal representatives looked into the possible breach of contract. As of midyear 2019 each agency is still operating on its own systems.

== Sources ==
- www.vecc9-1-1.com
