= Damien Patton =

American entrepreneur

Damien Patton (born July 11, 1972) is an American entrepreneur known for founding the AI company Banjo. He began his career in the U.S. Navy in 1991 and later transitioned to NASCAR, where he worked as a chief mechanic while earning a business degree from the University of North Carolina at Greensboro.

He founded Banjo in 2010, which evolved into a public safety AI event detection service, gaining significant contracts until his past involvement with white supremacist groups during his youth was revealed in 2020, leading to his resignation as CEO. He has since apologized for his actions as a youth, publicly saying he "spent most of my adult lifetime working to make amends for this shameful period in my life."

== Early life ==
Damien Patton grew up in Torrance, California, and had a challenging childhood after his parents divorced when he was about five years old. His early life was marked by instability as he and his brother moved to live with their father and stepmother. Despite the difficulties at home, Patton was initially an A student and enjoyed showing a creative sense of style, taking fashion cues from celebrities during his early school years.

== Career ==
=== Early career ===
Patton joined the U.S. Navy in February 1991. In a 2015 Inc. profile, he said he wanted to enlist after seeing the 1990 Gulf War play out on TV. He said he rose up in rank on the aircraft carrier Kitty Hawk. He left after two tours, ending up in San Diego, California. Patton said he had a "building and construction company I started as a kid", and sold it when in his mid-20s.

After his military service, Patton taught himself to code, a skill he would use in his transition to the tech industry and his founding of his company, Banjo.

After starting on a NASCAR pit crew in 1993, he became the chief mechanic on a NASCAR team sponsored by Lowe's. His NASCAR career lasted eight years. Patton told Inc. that he got his degree from University of North Carolina at Greensboro's Bryant School of Business in three years while working for NASCAR, graduating magna cum laude.

He later worked as a crime scene investigator for Davidson, North Carolina Police Department while still working full-time. He eventually moved to Hawaii and got into wood flooring, including manufacturing, selling it in 2006.

By 2009 Patton was taking graduate classes at MIT, commuting from Las Vegas to Boston.

=== Banjo ===
After participating in hackathons in 2010 and 2011, Patton founded Banjo, then called Peer Compass, a company that created an "event-detection engine" which organizes geolocated public posts from various social media platforms. He developed software capable of performing over two quadrillion calculations per minute, monitoring a virtual grid of over 35 billion squares, each about the size of a football field, to detect anomalies in social media posts. Business figures such as Noam Bardin, co-founder and former CEO of Waze, and Tom Glocer, former CEO of Thomson Reuters, have praised Patton's approach and innovation in the field of social media intelligence.

Patton's entrepreneurial success with Banjo was significant, as the company became a high-growth startup that attracted nearly a quarter of a billion dollars in financing. His innovative approach in the tech industry earned him recognition and accolades from prominent business figures.

Banjo's technology has led to early success, with media outlets like NBC and ESPN being among its first paying customers. The system's effectiveness was demonstrated during events such as a shooting at Florida State University, where Banjo alerted media faster than other sources.

By 2014 Banjo had pivoted to AI event detection of surveillance video for public safety, gaining a $20 million contract for the State of Utah in 2019 and attention from privacy advocates. When Patton's ties to the KKK from when he was a minor were uncovered in April 2020, the company experienced significant negative publicity, and their government contracts with Utah and Indiana were suspended.

=== Personal life and interests ===
Patton was married to Lynn Battistelli of Memphis, Tennessee and had one child - at the time of his grand jury testimony in September 1991.

By 2015, Patton was married to Jennifer Peck, who worked at Banjo.

== Controversies ==
Patton was born on July 11, 1972. Fleeing an abusive home, Patton lived on the streets of Los Angeles and became involved with white supremacist groups as a teen, including the KKK and Aryan Nations. He participated in activities such as painting swastikas and impersonating an FBI agent. At 17, he was involved in a drive-by shooting of a synagogue, leading to his arrest and subsequent flight from the state. In 1992, during a trial, he admitted to past affiliations with skinheads in the Navy and pleaded guilty to a juvenile offense in exchange for testimony.

In April 2020, his involvement with the Dixie Knights chapter of the KKK as a teen was uncovered by journalist Matt Stroud. Following this revelation, Patton resigned from his position as CEO of Banjo.

Later as an adult, Patton said of his childhood, "I did terrible things and said despicable and hateful things, including to my own Jewish mother, that today I find indefensibly wrong, and feel extreme remorse for. I have spent most of my adult lifetime working to make amends for this shameful period in my life."

Jonathan Greenblatt, the director of the Anti-Defamation League (ADL), has played a significant role in defending Patton, offering a nuanced perspective on Patton's past and his journey toward redemption. Greenblatt first learned of Patton's story in April 2020, when news of Patton's involvement in white supremacist activities as a teenager resurfaced. Despite the gravity of Patton's past actions, Greenblatt chose to engage with him, seeking to understand the depth of his repentance and his efforts to make amends. Over time, the two developed a friendship, with Greenblatt recognizing the sincerity of Patton’s remorse and his commitment to change.

"Damien’s story is a reminder how virtually anyone – particularly young people – can be swept up into a hate movement given the right conditions and circumstances," Greenblatt wrote, emphasizing the importance of acknowledging the potential for personal growth and atonement.
