= List of woodcarvers =

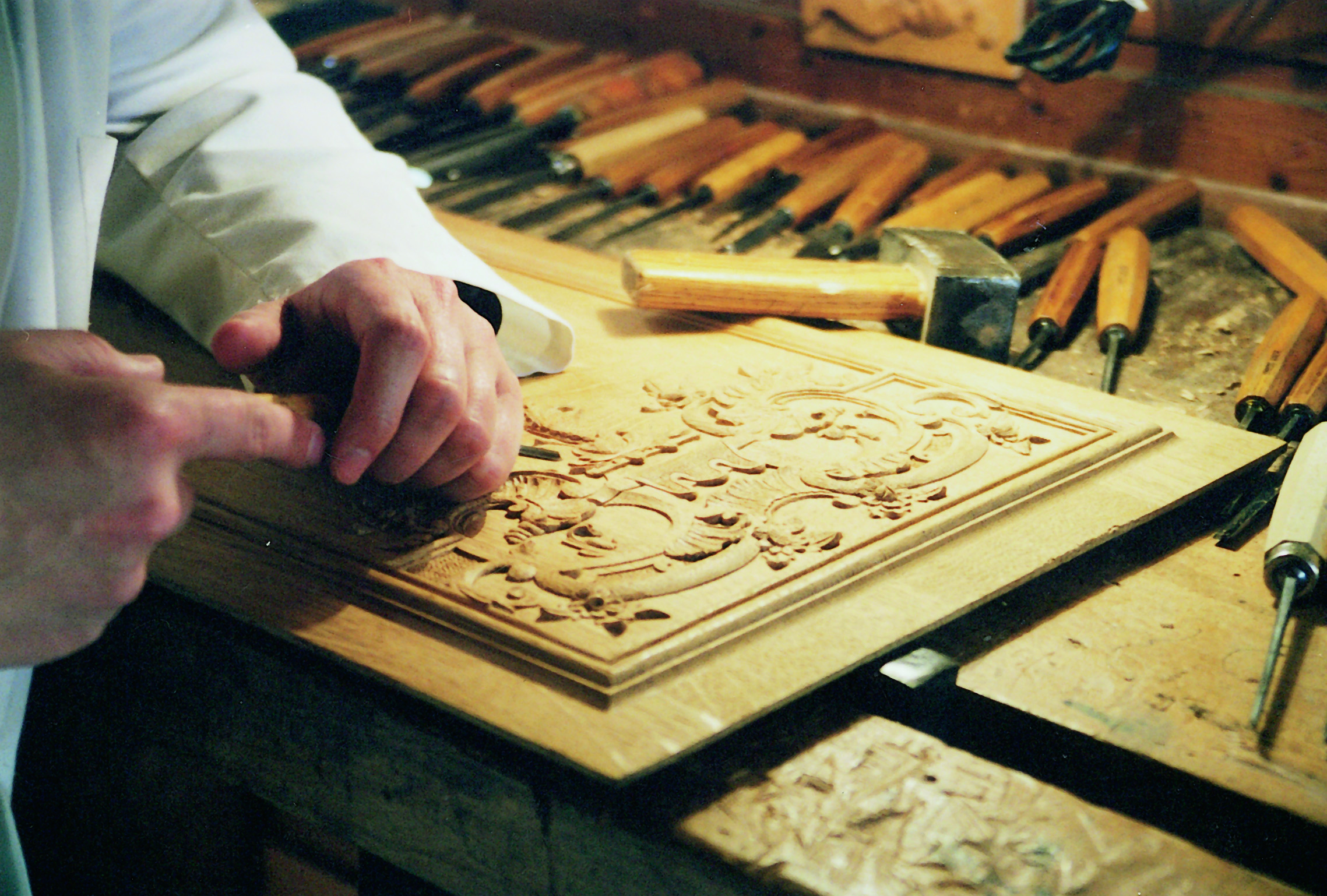
Example of woodcarving

This is a list of woodcarvers - notable people who are known for their working wood by means of a cutting tool (knife) in one hand or a chisel by two hands or with one hand on a chisel and one hand on a mallet, resulting in a wooden figure or figurine, or in the sculptural ornamentation of a wooden object.

This list is incomplete. You can help by expanding it.

== A ==
- Fritz Abplanalp (1907–1982)
- Alma Allen
- Gene Amondson (1943–2009)
- H. S. "Andy" Anderson (1893–1960)
- Wepiha Apanui
- John Wormald Appleyard (1831–1894)

== B ==
- Joseph A. Bailly
- Barn the Spoon
- Magnus Berg
- Leslie Garland Bolling

== C ==
- Dudley C. Carter
- Wendell Castle (1932–2018)
- Walter Channing Jr. (1940–2015)
- Johann Joseph Christian
- Jack Coutu
- A. Elmer Crowell
- Cherie Currie

== D ==
- Mario Dal Fabbro
- Giovanni Angelo Del Maino
- Delbert Daisey
- Beau Dick
- Axel Petersson Döderhultarn
- Patrick Damiaens

== E ==
- Henning Engelsen
- Harold Enlow

== F ==
- Lukman Alade Fakeye
- Jim Flora
- Jozef Fojtik (born 1960)
- William H. Fry

== G ==
- Edward Gallenstein
- John Geldersma
- Wendell Gilley
- Grinling Gibbons
- Alexander Grabovetskiy (born 1973)
- Félix Granda
- Ignaz Günther
- Grinling Gibbons

== H ==
- Ben Harms
- John Hemings
- Claude Raguet Hirst
- Bror Hjorth
- Albert Hoffman
- Hans Holst
- Advent Hunstone

== I ==
- Sophia Isberg (1819–1875)

== J ==
- Antoine Jacson
- Emil Janel
- Kåre Jonsborg (1912–1977)
- Lorentz Jørgensen

== K ==
- Marv Kaisersatt
- Johannes Kirchmayer
- Glisha Kostovski
- Jacob Kremberg

== L ==
- Armand LaMontagne
- Ron Lane
- Alois Lang
- Walter Langcake (1889–1967)
- Po Shun Leong (born 1941)
- Jan van Lokeren
- Mark Lindquist
- Mel Lindquist
- Robert Longhurst
- Charles I. D. Looff
- George López (1900–1993)

== M ==
- Fredy Malec Koschitz
- Andrew Mansioun
- Samuel McIntire
- Juan Martínez Montañés
- Josef Moriggl
- Kate Mosher
- Matt Moulthrop
- Philip Moulthrop
- Sarah Ann McMurray

== N ==
- Aaron Nelson-Moody
- Tamati Ngakaho

== O ==
- Calle Örnemark (1933–2015)

== P ==
- Park Chan-su (born 1949)
- Denis Alva Parsons
- Marko Penov
- Irvan Perez
- David E. Pergrin
- Te Waaka Perohuka
- Oscar W. Peterson (1887–1951)
- Walter J. Phillips
- Elijah Pierce (1892–1984)
- Lars Pinnerud
- Pinwill sisters (born 1870s), English woodcarvers
- Susan Point
- Piri Poutapu
- Hori Pukehika
- Alexander Pope, Jr.
- Don Potter

== R ==
- William Jesse Ramey (1891–1963)
- James Rattee
- Harley Refsal
- Remèr
- Tilman Riemenschneider (c.1460–1531)
- Jørgen Ringnis
- Raharuhi Rukupo

== S ==
- Abel Schrøder
- Pat Scott (1929–2016)
- Emil Seidel
- Paul Sellers
- Hans Seyffer
- Bob Spear
- Johannes Stenrat
- Dave Stetson
- Johann Gustav Stockenberg
- Veit Stoss (1447–1533)

== T ==
- Hōne Taiapa
- Frederick William Tod
- Edgar Tolson
- Carl Johan Trygg
- Carl Olof Trygg
- Lars Trygg (1929–1999)
- Nils Trygg

== V ==
- Peter Van Dievoet

== W ==
- Ignaz Waibl
- Thomas Wilkinson Wallis
- Lemuel and Steven Ward
- Werburgh Welch
- Ben Wilson
- Tom Wolfe
- Kester Womack

== Z ==
- Gene Zesch (1863–1949)

== See also ==
- List of sculptors
- List of people by occupation
- List of woodturners
- Woodcarving
