= Trygg =

Trygg may refer to:

== People ==
- Carl Johan Trygg (1887–1954), Scandinavian woodcarver
- Carl Olaf Trygg (1910-1993), Scandinavian woodcarver
- Lars Trygg (1929–1999), Scandinavian woodcarver
- Mats Trygg (born 1976), Norwegian ice hockey player
- Marius Trygg (born 1976), Norwegian ice hockey player
- Mathias Trygg (born 1986), Norwegian ice hockey player
- Nils Trygg (1914–1951), Scandinavian woodcarver

== Other uses ==
- Trygg the Sorcerer, a comic book character by DC Comics
- Trygg Hansa, a Swedish company acquired by Skandinaviska Enskilda Banken
- Trygg class torpedo boat, Royal Norwegian Navy
- HNoMS Trygg, several ships of the Royal Norwegian Navy
- SFK Trygg, a Norwegian sports club

== See also ==
- Trigg (disambiguation)
- Triggs (disambiguation)
