= Carl Trygg =

Carl Trygg may refer to:

- Carl Johan Trygg (1887–1954), Swedish woodcarver
- Carl Olof Trygg (1910–1993), his son, Swedish woodcarver
