= H. S. "Andy" Anderson =

American woodcarver

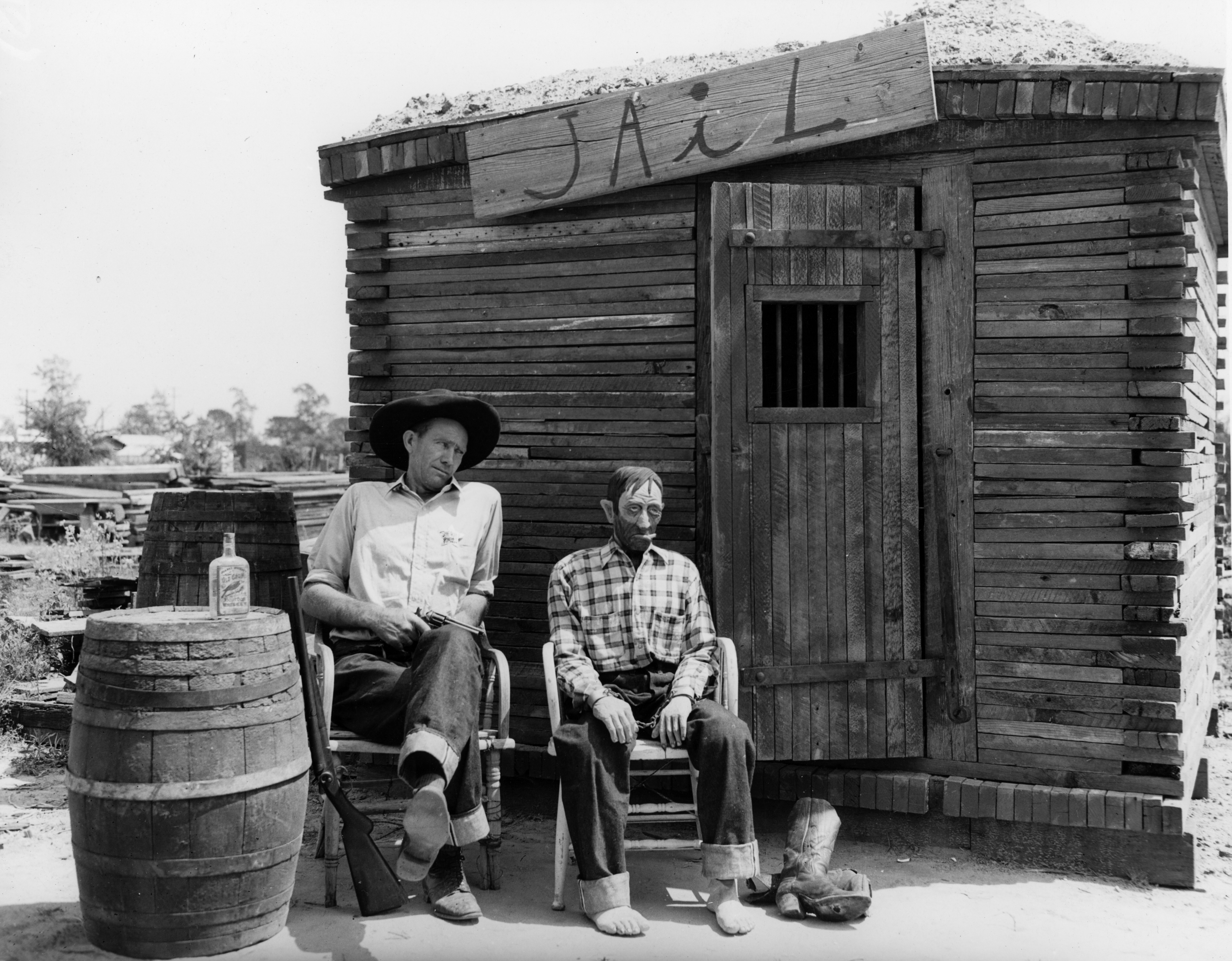
Anderson with Sad Eye Joe in Knott's Berry Farm, 1941

Herbert S. Anderson (October 7, 1892 – August 20, 1960), known commonly as H. S. "Andy" Anderson, was an American woodcarver, one of the recognized masters of 20th-century woodcarving, most famous for Scandinavian flat-plane style of woodcarving and caricature carving.

== Early years ==
Anderson was born in Chicago in 1892, to Swedish immigrants Charles (Carl) Anderson and Matilda "Tillie" Lindbloom, who had married in Nebraska in 1891. When he was a teenager he moved with his family to Turret, Colorado. At the age of 16, he left home to work as a cowboy. While he was out working as a cowpoke earning a meager $30 per month he began to develop ideas for wood carved characters. He wrote in his book "One day a cowboy rode in from Wyoming, who was the homeliest man I had ever laid eyes on. All the rest of that day I could see him in my mind and thought, 'What a good character he would make for a wood carving!' He was my first model, and this was my first attempt at carving a likeness of anyone. The figure of this old weather-beaten cowpoke turned out real good (much to my surprise) and from then on I started carving characters."

In 1927, Anderson moved to California to be near his parents. His figure carving began to develop as he was creating characters of the Old West. He began carving full-time and earned a respectable living through the 1930s.

== Legacy ==
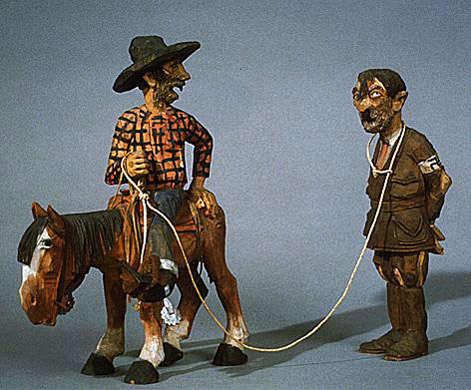
Cowboy and Adolf Hitler, by H. S. Anderson, Topanga, California, 1942

During World War II, most of the items Anderson carved went to high-ranking officials in the U.S. Army and one was even given as a gift to President Franklin D. Roosevelt from Jesse Jones, Secretary of Commerce

Anderson became known as one of America's great artists. His work, as well as photos of his work, were circulated worldwide, and he served as an inspiration to other woodcarvers, including Harold Enlow.

Anderson's work can be viewed at the Stark Museum of Art, Nelda C. & H. J. Lutcher Stark Foundation, in Orange, Texas. An amazing collection of Anderson's work has also been collected by Koshare Indian Dancers in La Junta, Colorado. The collection includes carved figures, furniture, and a carved door that had been collected by the Koshare Indian Dancers, through many visits with the artist at his home in Tesuque, New Mexico.

He carved Sad-Eye Joe and a number of the other figures in the "peek ins" at Ghost Town at Knott's Berry Farm in Buena Park, California. Anderson was also a talented graphic artist, and illustrated the cover for the first guidebook at the farm.

== Published works ==
- Anderson, H. S. "Andy" How to Carve Characters in Wood, Albuquerque University of New Mexico Press (1953)
- Anderson, H. S. "Andy" How to Carve Characters in Wood, Old West Publishing Co. (1972)
