= Penov =

Penov is a Macedonian (Macedonian: Пенов), Bulgarian (Bulgarian: Пенов), and Croatian (Croatian: Penov) surname. Notable people with this surname include:

- Igor Penov (born 1984), Macedonian basketball player
- Ljuma Penov, Serbian actress
- Marko Penov (1922–1998), Serbian woodcarver
