= Trigg =

Trigg may refer to:

== People ==
=== Surnames ===
- Abram Trigg (1750– c. 1813), American politician from Virginia
- Charles W. Trigg (1898—1989), American mathematician
- Connally Findlay Trigg (congressman) (1847–1907), American soldier and politician
- Connally Findlay Trigg (judge) (1810–1880), American judge
- Cyril Trigg (1917–1993), English footballer
- Frank Trigg (born 1972), American mixed martial artist
- Frank Trigg (educator) (c. 1850–1933), American educator, college president
- Henry Trigg (public servant) (1791–1882), public servant
- Henry Trigg (testator) (c. 1667–1724), British grocer famous for his eccentric will
- John Johns Trigg (1748–1804), American farmer and politician from Virginia
- Johnny Trigg (born 1938), American BBQ chef
- Lloyd Allan Trigg (1914–1943), New Zealand pilot, awarded the Victoria Cross
- Mary K. Trigg, American women's and gender studies academic
- Michael Trigg (quarterback), American football player
- Noel Trigg, (born 1938), British boxer
- Roy Trigg (born 1943), English motorcycle rider
- Stephen Trigg (c. 1744–1782), American pioneer and soldier in Kentucky
- Stephanie Trigg, Australian literary scholar, medieval studies academic

=== Given names ===
- Trigg H. Knutson (1879–1952), American businessman and politician

== Places ==
- Trigg, Western Australia, a suburb of Perth, Australia
- Triggshire, an ancient hundred of Cornwall; also known as Trigg
- Trigg County, Kentucky, United States

== Other ==
- John Trigg Ester Library, in Ester, Alaska, United States
- William R. Trigg Company, an inland shipyard in Richmond, Virginia, United States, circa 1900

== See also ==
- Triggs (disambiguation)
- Trygg (disambiguation)
