= Alexander Pope (disambiguation) =

Alexander Pope (1688–1744) was an English poet.

Alexander Pope may also refer to:

- Alexander Pope (actor) (1763–1835), Irish actor and painter
- Alexander Pope Jr. (1849–1924), American sporting artist
- Alex Pope (born 1944), Australian rugby union player
- Alexander Pope (Texas politician), see Twentieth Texas Legislature and Twenty-first Texas Legislature

== See also ==
- Pope Alexander (disambiguation)
