= Pittsburg, California =

City in California, United States

- City
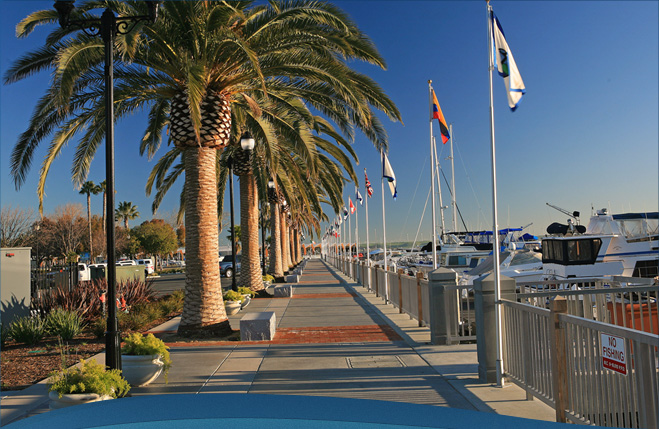
- The Boardwalk

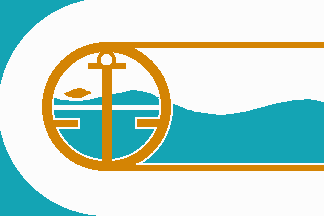
- Flag
- Nickname: "P-World" "The Burg"
- Motto: Gateway to the Delta!
- Interactive map of Pittsburg, California
- Location in the United States
- Coordinates: 38°01′41″N 121°53′05″W
- Country: United States
- State: California
- County: Contra Costa
- Incorporated: June 25, 1903
- Named for: Pittsburgh, Pennsylvania

Government
  - Type: General Law City
  - Mayor: Dionne Adams
  - State Senator: Tim Grayson (D)
  - State Assembly: Anamarie Avila Farias (D)
  - U. S. Congress: John Garamendi (D)

Area
  - Total: 19.75 sq mi (51.14 km^{2})
  - Land: 17.68 sq mi (45.78 km^{2})
  - Water: 2.07 sq mi (5.36 km^{2}) 10.48%
- Elevation: 26 ft (8 m)

Population (2020)
  - Total: 76,416
  - Density: 4,332/sq mi (1,672.5/km^{2})
- Time zone: UTC-8 (PST)
  - Summer (DST): UTC-7 (PDT)
- ZIP code: 94565
- Area code: 925
- FIPS code: 06-57456
- GNIS feature IDs: 1659783, 2411430
- Website: www.pittsburgca.gov

Pittsburg (formerly Black Diamond, New York Landing, and New York of the Pacific) is a city in Contra Costa County, California, United States. It is an industrial suburb on the southern shore of the Suisun Bay in the East Bay region of the San Francisco Bay Area, and is part of the Sacramento–San Joaquin River Delta area, the Eastern Contra Costa County area, and the San Francisco Bay Area. The population was 76,416 at the 2020 United States census.

== History ==
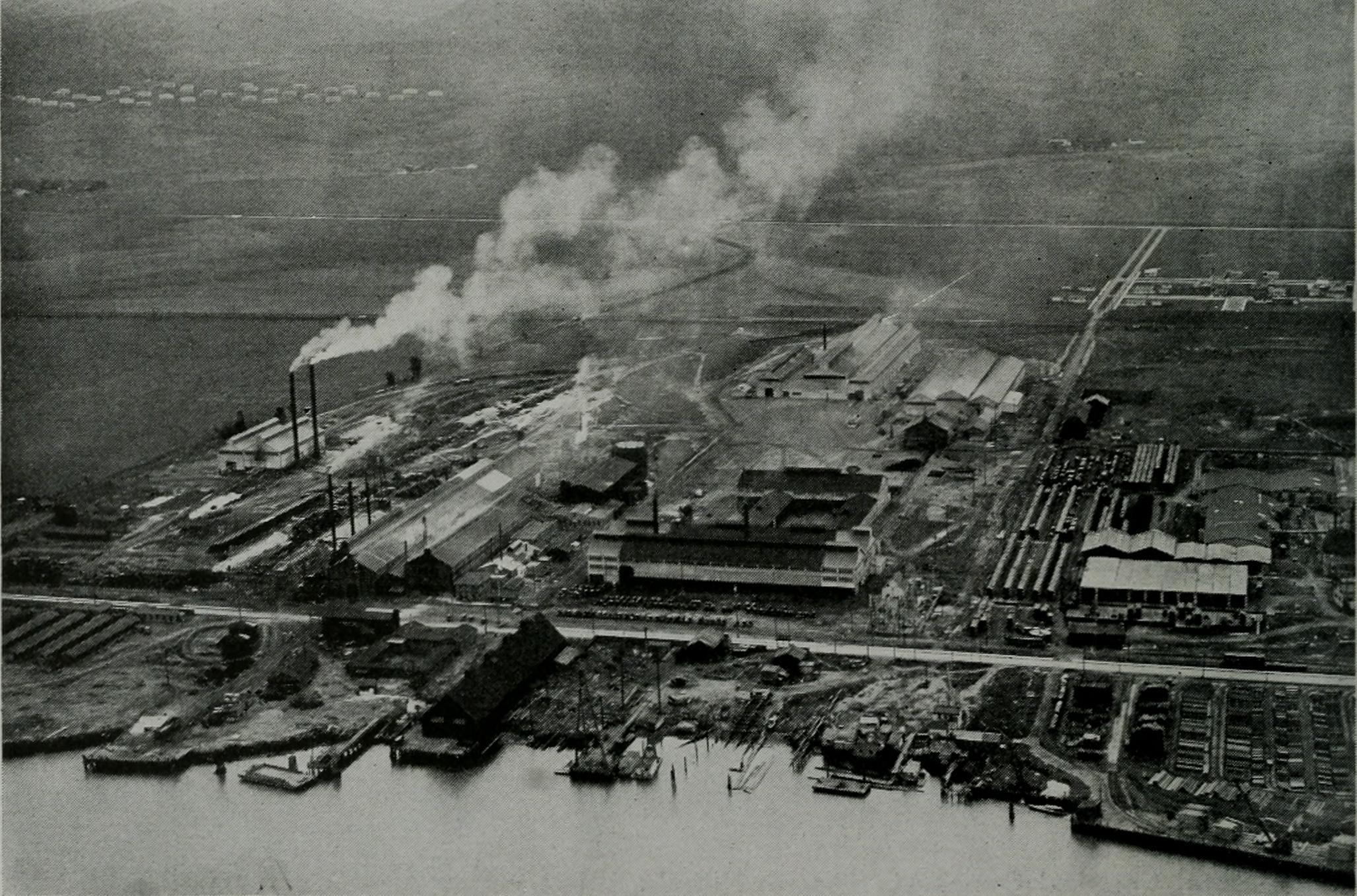
Columbia Steel plant in Pittsburg, established in 1910

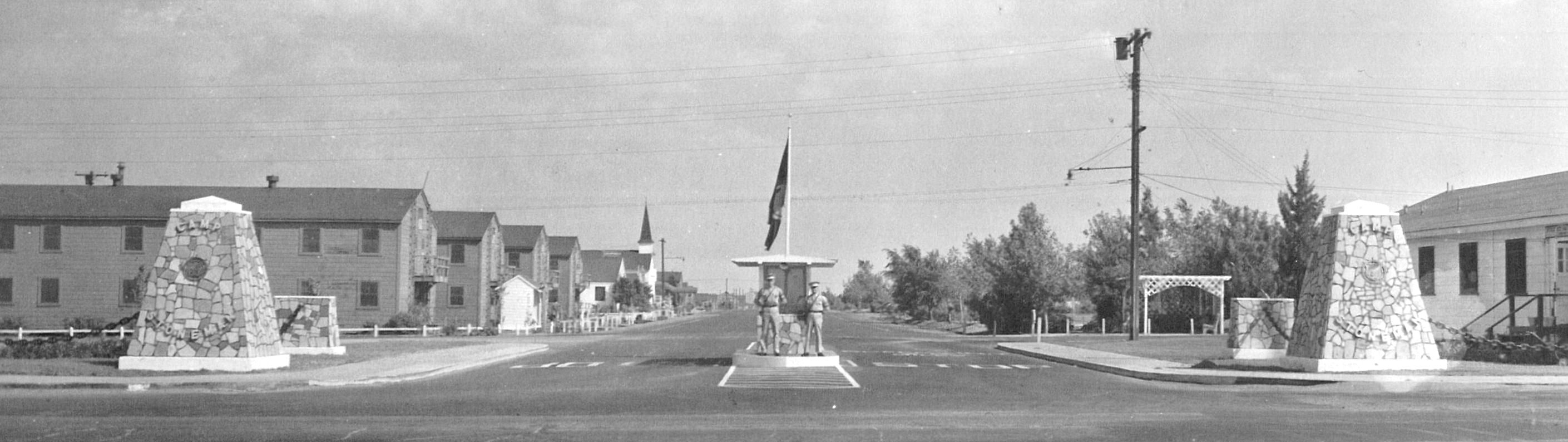
Camp Stoneman Gate

Originally settled in 1839 as Rancho Los Méganos, the area of almost 10,000 acres was issued to Californios Jose Antonio Mesa and his brother Jose Miguel under a Mexican Land Grant by then Governor Juan Bautista Alvarado, one of the final land grants issued prior to the formation of California as a state.

In 1849, during the California gold rush, Colonel Jonathan D. Stevenson (from New York) bought Rancho Los Méganos for speculation, and laid out a town he called "New York of the Pacific". Lieutenant William Tecumseh Sherman, future General of the Army, laid out the first network of streets on the west side of town. The area was the midway stopping point for schooners traveling from San Francisco to the gold country further inland. Fishing, farming, and cattle raising for the hide and tallow industry were the major economic activities during this time.

In 1859, with the discovery of coal in the nearby town of Nortonville, the place became a port for coal. The Black Diamond Coal Mining Company commenced operations, building the Black Diamond Coal Mining Railroad to Nortonville. Steam-powered engines moved coal cars down the tracks along present-day Railroad Avenue to the waterfront docks that came to be called "Black Diamond Landing." The boom ended in 1885, and the company moved to Washington Territory to work a new claim.

In the 1870s, commercial fishing took hold, and the Black Diamond Cannery was established at the foot of Los Medanos Street. By 1882, a network of ten canneries was formed along the Sacramento Delta. An industry was born with fishermen, packing plants, boat builders and the like dominating the local waterfront for the next 80 years. The town boasted the largest Delta fishing community in the state, made up primarily of Sicilian immigrants, the families of which have remained in the area for generations. In 1957, the State of California closed down the Sacramento Delta to commercial fishing, ending the area's industry.

In 1900, C. A. Hooper purchased the land grant and gave birth to many manufacturing ventures, beginning in 1903 with the creation of the Industrial Center of the West. Hooper secured additional capitalization and provided property for the Columbia Steel Company, which, in 1910, opened its California steel plant in the town with one foundry and a crew of 60 employees. It made steel castings for the dredging, lumber and shipping industries.

In 1903 the town was incorporated, and by a vote of the citizenry, was renamed "Black Diamond", after the mining firm. Because of the industrial potential of the site, a name change to "Pittsburg" was proposed in 1909. On February 11, 1911, the city officials changed the town's name to "Pittsburg", honoring Pittsburgh, Pennsylvania, as the two cities shared a common steel and mining industrial heritage. This rechristening came at a time when the name of Pittsburgh, Pennsylvania, was more commonly spelled without the "h". In 1926 Johns-Manville opened its first West Coast factory in Pittsburg.

In 1930, Columbia Steel became a subsidiary of U.S. Steel. The Pittsburg plant continued to grow until the early 1950s, reaching a peak staff of 5,200 employees when the markets for its products crashed. In 1986, U.S. Steel entered into a joint venture with Pohang Iron and Steel Company of South Korea. Together, they invested $450 million to turn the Pittsburg plant into a modern flat-products mill, renamed USS-POSCO Industries. By 1999, the facility employed 970 workers and shipped over 1.6 million U.S. tons of steel per year to over 175 customers in the Western United States, Mexico, Canada and the Pacific Rim, although POSCO announced its plans to close the facility by the end of 2023.

The original town site fronts on the Sacramento/San Joaquin River Delta, reflecting its origins as a deep-water channel river port (As of January 1, 2007, state legislation [Assembly Bill 2324] enabled the city to manage its own riverfront for commercial development and subsequent port operations). Since the early 1900s, the city has grown inland to the south, then spread east and west along State Route 4, now a freeway carrying resident commuters to jobs in the San Francisco Bay-Oakland Region. In the process, the former town of Cornwall, California, was absorbed. As of the 2000 census, the city had a total population of 56,769.

Camp Stoneman was built in 1942, and was a major staging area for the United States Army during World War II and the Korean War until 1954.

The first post office opened in 1868 as Black Diamond and changed its name along with the town in 1911.

== Geography ==
Pittsburg shares a border with the unincorporated community of Bay Point to the west, the city of Concord to the southwest and Antioch to the east. Suisun Bay is directly north of the city and connects San Francisco Bay to the Sacramento and San Joaquin rivers.

=== Climate ===
Pittsburg experiences a hot summer Mediterranean climate (Köppen climate classification Csa) bordering on the Semi-arid climate because of the Mt. Diablo rain shadow in East Contra Costa County.

Climate data for Pittsburg, California
Month	Jan	Feb	Mar	Apr	May	Jun	Jul	Aug	Sep	Oct	Nov	Dec	Year
Mean daily maximum °F (°C)	57.6 (14.2)	60.1 (15.6)	71.1 (21.7)	79.0 (26.1)	86.0 (30.0)	91.0 (32.8)	90.0 (32.2)	86.0 (30.0)	78.1 (25.6)	64.9 (18.3)	64.0 (17.8)	54.0 (12.2)	73.0 (22.8)
Mean daily minimum °F (°C)	37.9 (3.3)	41.0 (5.0)	46.9 (8.3)	52.0 (11.1)	57.0 (13.9)	57.9 (14.4)	57.9 (14.4)	55.9 (13.3)	51.1 (10.6)	44.1 (6.7)	44.1 (6.7)	36.0 (2.2)	48.6 (9.2)
Average precipitation inches (mm)	2.72 (69)	2.51 (64)	2.16 (55)	0.73 (19)	0.47 (12)	0.09 (2.3)	0.03 (0.76)	0.03 (0.76)	0.24 (6.1)	0.76 (19)	1.77 (45)	1.89 (48)	13.33 (339)

== Demographics ==
Historical population
Census	Pop.	Note	%±
1890	300		—
1900	603		101.0%
1910	2,372		293.4%
1920	4,715		98.8%
1930	9,610		103.8%
1940	9,520		−0.9%
1950	12,763		34.1%
1960	19,062		49.4%
1970	21,423		12.4%
1980	33,034		54.2%
1990	47,564		44.0%
2000	56,769		19.4%
2010	63,264		11.4%
2020	76,416		20.8%
U.S. Decennial Census

=== Racial and ethnic composition ===
Pittsburg, California – Racial and Ethnic Composition (NH = Non-Hispanic) Note: the US Census treats Hispanic/Latino as an ethnic category. This table excludes Latinos from the racial categories and assigns them to a separate category. Hispanics/Latinos may be of any race.
Race / Ethnicity	Pop 2000	Pop 2010	Pop 2020	% 2000	% 2010	% 2020
White alone (NH)	17,697	12,684	11,888	31.17%	20.05%	18.9%
Black or African American alone (NH)	10,457	10,756	12,441	18.42%	17.00%	15.2%
Native American or Alaska Native alone (NH)	210	202	218	0.37%	0.32%	1.2%
Asian alone (NH)	7,031	9,654	14,725	12.39%	15.26%	17.8%
Pacific Islander alone (NH)	464	614	825	0.82%	0.97%	1.0%
Mixed Race or Multi-Racial (NH)	2,433	2,336	3,502	4.29%	3.69%	4.52%
Hispanic or Latino (any race)	18,287	26,841	32,300	32.21%	42.43%	43.2%
Total	56,769	63,264	76,416	100.00%	100.00%	100.00%

=== 2020 census ===
As of the 2020 census, Pittsburg had a population of 76,416 and a population density of 4,323.2 inhabitants per square mile (1,669.2/km^{2}).

The racial makeup of Pittsburg was 20.8% White, 16.8% African American, 1.4% Native American, 19.7% Asian, 1.2% Pacific Islander, 25.7% from other races, and 14.3% from two or more races. Hispanic or Latino of any race were 42.3% of the population.

The age distribution was 24.2% under the age of 18, 9.6% aged 18 to 24, 29.0% aged 25 to 44, 24.6% aged 45 to 64, and 12.5% who were 65 years of age or older. The median age was 35.7 years. For every 100 females, there were 94.9 males, and for every 100 females age 18 and over there were 92.2 males age 18 and over.

The census reported that 99.4% of the population lived in households, 0.4% lived in non-institutionalized group quarters, and 0.2% were institutionalized. 100.0% of residents lived in urban areas, while 0.0% lived in rural areas.

There were 23,370 households, out of which 41.3% had children under the age of 18 living in them. Of all households, 48.6% were married-couple households, 7.4% were cohabiting couple households, 15.8% had a male householder with no spouse or partner present, and 28.2% had a female householder with no spouse or partner present. 17.6% of households were made up of individuals, and 7.2% had someone living alone who was 65 years of age or older. There were 17,823 families (76.3% of all households). The average household size was 3.25.

There were 24,078 housing units at an average density of 1,362.2 units per square mile (525.9 units/km^{2}), of which 23,370 (97.1%) were occupied. Of occupied housing units, 56.5% were owner-occupied and 43.5% were occupied by renters. 2.9% of housing units were vacant; the homeowner vacancy rate was 0.4% and the rental vacancy rate was 3.6%.

=== 2023 estimate ===
In 2023, the US Census Bureau estimated that the median household income was $101,099, and the per capita income was $39,067. About 8.2% of families and 11.0% of the population were below the poverty line.

=== 2010 census ===
The 2010 United States census reported that Pittsburg had a population of 63,264. The population density was 3,302.8 inhabitants per square mile (1,275.2/km^{2}). The racial makeup of Pittsburg was 23,106 (36.5%) White, 11,187 (17.7%) African American, 517 (0.8%) Native American, 9,891 (15.6%) Asian (9.9% Filipino, 2.0% Indian, 1.2% Chinese, 1.1% Vietnamese, 0.2% Korean, 0.2% Japanese, 1.1% Other), 645 (1.0%) Pacific Islander, 13,270 (21.0%) from other races, and 4,648 (7.3%) from two or more races. Hispanic or Latino of any race were 26,841 persons (42.4%).

The Census reported that 62,973 people (99.5% of the population) lived in households, 153 (0.2%) lived in non-institutionalized group quarters, and 138 (0.2%) were institutionalized.

There were 19,527 households, out of which 8,837 (45.3%) had children under the age of 18 living in them, 9,833 (50.4%) were opposite-sex married couples living together, 3,583 (18.3%) had a female householder with no husband present, 1,420 (7.3%) had a male householder with no wife present. There were 1,432 (7.3%) unmarried opposite-sex partnerships, and 194 (1.0%) same-sex married couples or partnerships. 3,446 households (17.6%) were made up of individuals, and 1,067 (5.5%) had someone living alone who was 65 years of age or older. The average household size was 3.22. There were 14,836 families (76.0% of all households); the average family size was 3.64.

The population was spread out, with 17,385 people (27.5%) under the age of 18, 6,823 people (10.8%) aged 18 to 24, 18,319 people (29.0%) aged 25 to 44, 15,298 people (24.2%) aged 45 to 64, and 5,439 people (8.6%) who were 65 years of age or older. The median age was 32.5 years. For every 100 females, there were 94.9 males. For every 100 females age 18 and over, there were 92.4 males.

There were 21,126 housing units at an average density of 1,102.9 units per square mile (425.8 units/km^{2}), of which 19,527 were occupied, of which 11,490 (58.8%) were owner-occupied, and 8,037 (41.2%) were occupied by renters. The homeowner vacancy rate was 3.8%; the rental vacancy rate was 6.8%. 37,078 people (58.6% of the population) lived in owner-occupied housing units and 25,895 people (40.9%) lived in rental housing units.

== Economy ==
Coal mining and industry have been part of the economy since the late 1800s. USS-POSCO Industries and Corteva maintain plants in Pittsburg. In the 2020s, the closure of the steel mill and downsizing of a Dow Chemical plant have brought economic challenges.

=== Top employers ===
According to the city's 2020 Comprehensive Annual Financial Report, the top employers in the city are:

#	Employer	# of Employees
1	Pittsburg Unified School District	1,221
2	Los Medanos College	584
4	Dow Chemical Company	350
5	Ramar Foods	370
6	City of Pittsburg	340
7	Wal-Mart	222
8	Home-Depot	188
9	WinCo Foods	168
10	Cardenas (supermarket)	143

NOTE:  The former No. 3 employer POSCO Steet is now closed

== Arts and culture ==
=== Museums and theatres ===
The Pittsburg Historical Museum, established in 1961, has been situated in the historic former Pittsburg Post Dispatch building since 2003.

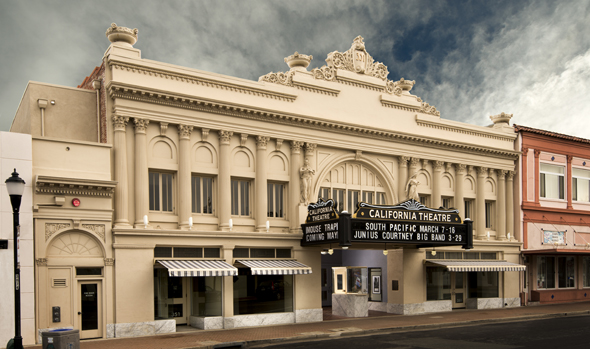
California Theatre

The California Theatre, opened in 1920, began as a venue for live vaudeville performances and silent films. During its heyday, notable performers included Flash Gordon and cowboy heroes Ray "Crash" Corrigan, Tim Holt, Tex Ritter and Fred Scott. The California Theatre closed in 1954 and began to deteriorate, prompting a $7.6 million renovation in 2008 and an additional $2 million restoration in 2022. Today, the auditorium features a 981-seat capacity, beaux-arts style ceiling decoration, and a grand balcony.

=== Festivals ===
- Pittsburg Seafood & Music Festival, an annual celebration held in September since its inception in 1984. It ended in 2025.
- Pittsburg Jazz, Blues and Funk Festival.
- Pittsburg Car Show, held from May to September each year, featuring cars and live bands.
- Holiday Parade, an annual event held in December, featuring City dignitaries, the Pittsburg High School Marching Band, and floats parading down Railroad Avenue.

=== Public libraries ===
Pittsburg hosts one of the many Contra Costa County Libraries.

== Sports ==
The Pittsburg Diamonds were an independent professional baseball team in the Pacific Association of Professional Baseball Clubs from 2014 to 2019. The team played its home games in City Park Field #1 until going on hiatus for 2019 and 2020. The Pacific Association has since folded, leaving Pittsburg without independent baseball.

== Government ==
According to the California Secretary of State, as of February 10, 2019, Pittsburg has 33,751 registered voters. Of those, 18,644 (55.2%) are registered Democrats, 3,817 (11.3%) are registered Republicans, and 9,888 (29.3%) have declined to state a political party.

== Education ==
Pittsburg is home to Los Medanos College, a two-year community college that is part of the Contra Costa Community College District. The college's name is derived from that of Rancho Los Medanos, one of the land grants made by the Mexican Government during its sovereignty over California from 1821 to 1846; Los Medanos, loosely translated from Spanish, means The Sand Dunes. Construction on Los Medanos College was completed in 1974.

=== Public schools ===
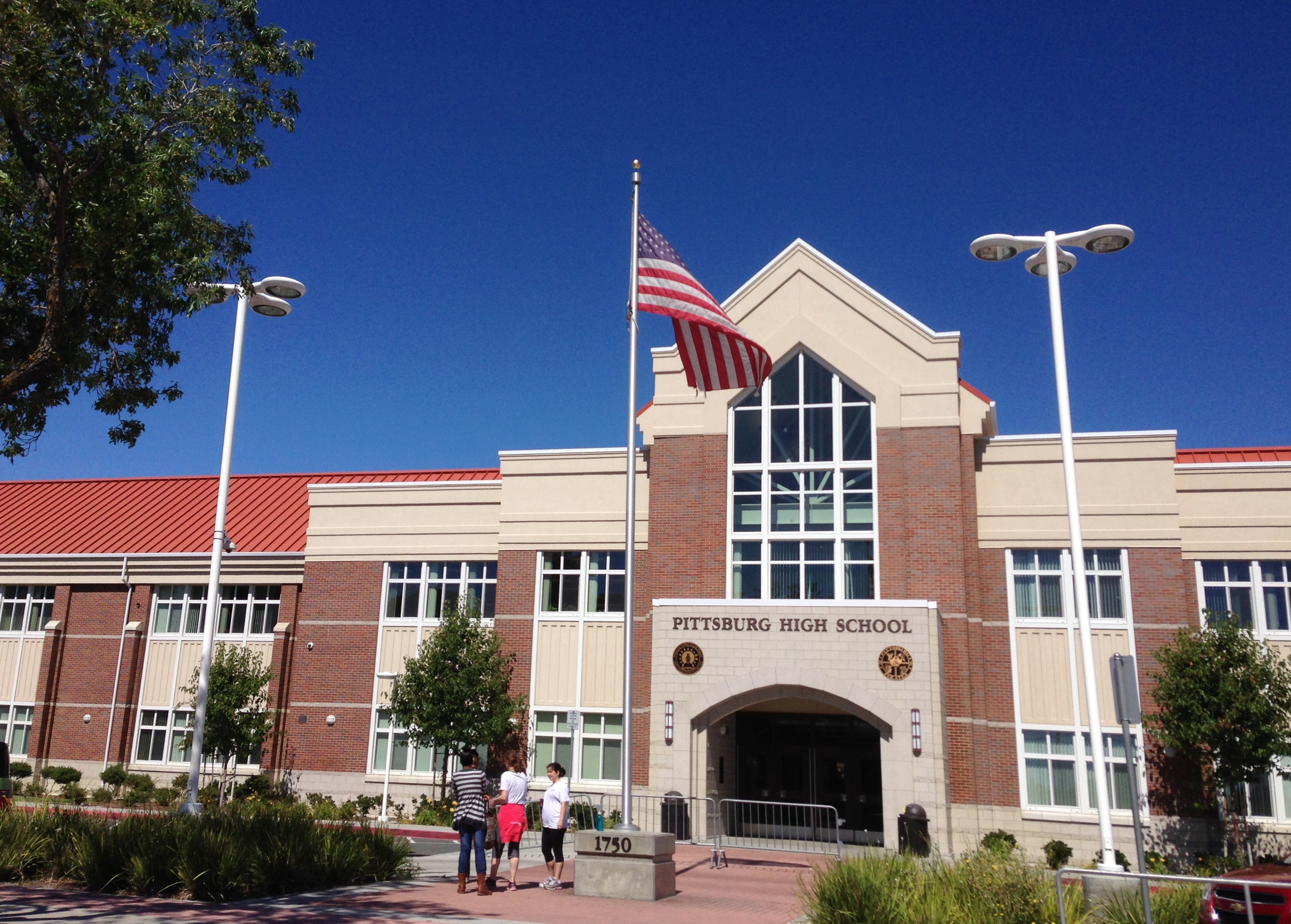
Pittsburg High School

The vast majority of the city is in the Pittsburg Unified School District. Pittsburg USD schools include:

- Black Diamond Continuation High School
- Foothill Elementary School
- Heights Elementary School
- Highlands Elementary School
- Hillview Junior High School
- Los Medanos Elementary School
- Marina Vista Elementary School
- Martin Luther King Jr. High School
- Parkside Elementary School
- Pittsburg High School
- Rancho Medanos Junior High School
- Stoneman Elementary School
- Willow Cove Elementary School

Portions of the city limits are in the Mount Diablo Unified School District and the Antioch Unified School District.

=== Private schools ===
- The Christian Center
- School of Saint Peter Martyr
- Spectrum Center

== Media ==
The city of Pittsburg was originally served by the Pittsburg Post-Dispatch, which was merged with the Daily Ledger of Antioch to form "Ledger Dispatch" Today, the city is served by the daily newspaper the East Bay Times (formerly the Contra Costa Times) published by Bay Area News Group.

== Infrastructure ==
=== Transportation ===
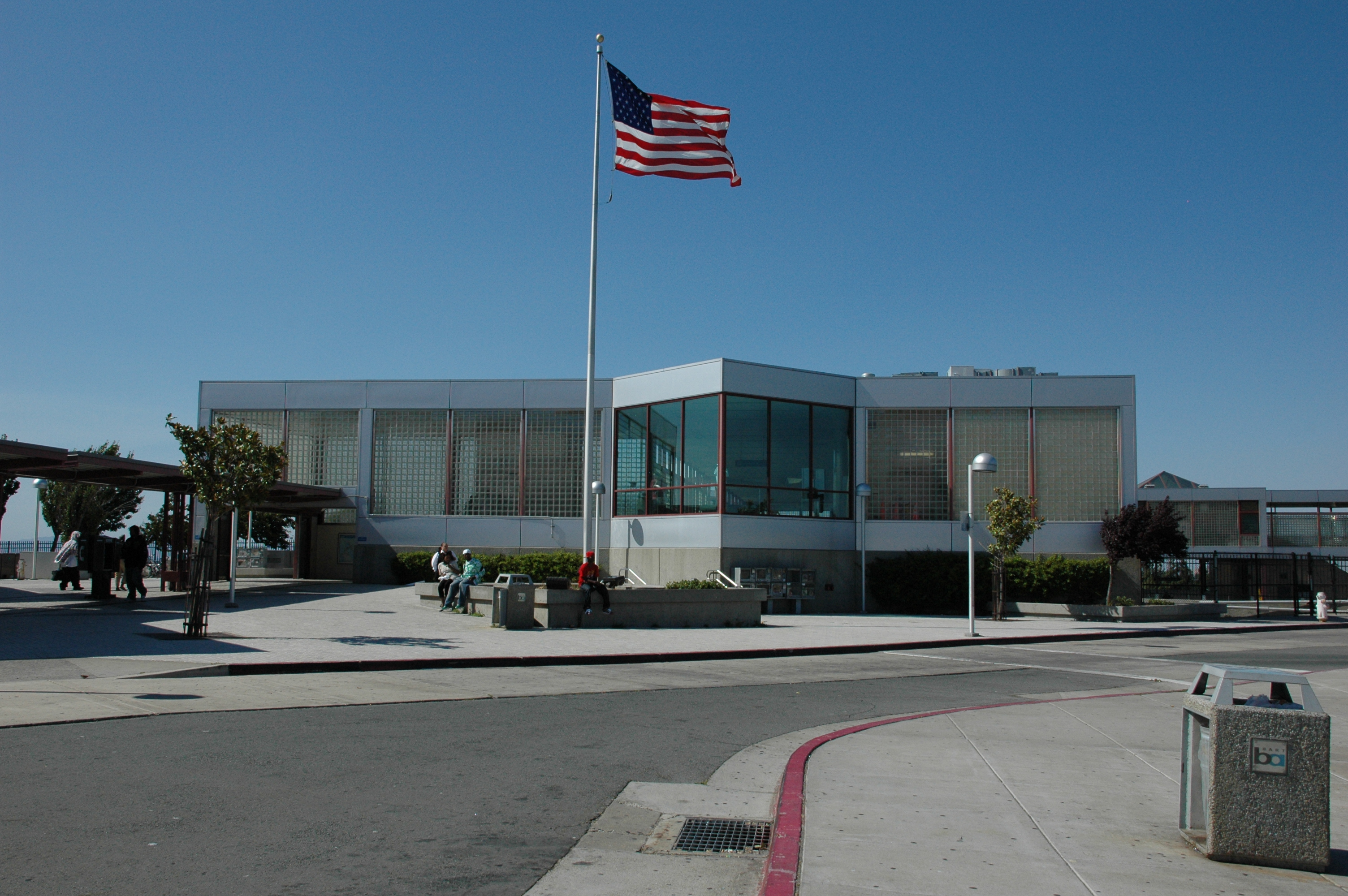
Pittsburg/Bay Point BART Station

The city has two BART stations, the Pittsburg/Bay Point station located on Bailey Road and Highway 4 near Bay Point and the Pittsburg Center Station located on Railroad Avenue and Highway 4. Tri Delta Transit provides bus service in the area. California State Route 4 bisects the city from west to east.

== Notable people ==
- Justin Baesman (born 1981), mixed martial artist
- Dante Basco (born 1975), actor
- Dion Basco (born 1977), actor; brother of Dante
- Toni Blackman, rapper
- Bert Bonanno (born 1940), track and field coach
- Marvin Burke (1918–1994), NASCAR driver
- Joe Canciamilla (born 1955), politician
- Cameron Colvin (born 1986), footballer
- John Coughran (born 1951), basketballer
- Xavier Crawford (born 1995), footballer
- Brian Dailey (born 1951), artist
- Darrell Daniels (born 1994), footballer
- Pete Escovedo (born 1935), percussionist
- Sal Esquivel (born 1948), businessman
- Rosie Gaines (born 1960), musician
- Donald George, operatic tenor
- Luis Gutierrez (born 1933), artist
- Shaunard Harts (born 1978), footballer
- Rydah J. Klyde, rapper
- Paul E. Koelliker (1943-2022), general authority of LDS Church
- Steve Lopez (born 1953), journalist
- Pat McNeil (born 1954), footballer
- Aaron Miles (born 1976), baseballer
- Dominick Newton (1977–2015), rapper better known as "The Jacka"
- Joe O'Brien (born 1972), footballer
- James "Mighty Quinn" Page (born 1971), boxer
- Avery Patterson, footballer
- Broderick Perkins (born 1954), baseballer
- Evan Pilgrim (born 1972), footballer
- Ken Simonton (born 1979), footballer
- Dave Stetson (born 1946), co-creator of Caricature Carvers of America
- Joe Tafoya (born 1978), footballer
- Altie Taylor (1947–2010), footballer
- Tony Teresa (1933–1984), footballer
- Mario Verduzco, football coach
- Karen Vogtmann (born 1949), mathematician
- Annabelle Wallis (born 1984), actress
- Keith Daniel Williams (1947–1996), murderer
- Stan Williamson (1909–1965), footballer

== Sister cities ==
Pittsburg is twinned with:

- Isola delle Femmine, Italy
- Pohang, South Korea
- Shimonoseki, Japan
- Yahualica de González Gallo, Mexico
