= Tom Wolfe (woodcarver) =

Tom James Wolfe began woodcarving at the age of 12. He has become one of America's leading wood carvers with nearly 50 books in print with Schiffer Publications to date. Tom currently resides in Spruce Pine, NC and teaches classes several times a year at his workshop on Grandfather Mountain, as well as at the John C. Campbell School in Brasstown NC. In recent years Tom has taught classes in New Jersey, Tennessee, and Canada. Tom is a lifetime member of the Southern Highland Craft Guild, having been awarded this distinction in 2006, and can be found demonstrating and selling his original wood carvings at many of the Guilds shops several times throughout the year. Tom's main area of artistic exploration is what is referred to as Caricature Carving. He is a member of the Caricature Carvers of America (CCA), an association of like-minded artists who work to further the craft and the public's greater appreciation and understanding of it.

== Books published ==
Caricatures in Clay with Tom Wolfe
Basic Penknife Carving with Tom Wolfe
Carving Traditional Woodspirits with Tom Wolfe
Carving Bottlestoppers with Tom Wolfe
Carving Canes & Walking Sticks with Tom Wolfe
Carving Cigar Humidors with Tom Wolfe
Carving Desperados with Tom Wolfe
Carving Down-Home Angels with Tom Wolfe
Carving From Roughouts with Tom Wolfe
Carving Gnomes with Tom Wolfe
Carving Out the Wild West with Tom Wolfe: The Saloon
Carving Santas for Today: With Tom Wolfe
Carving the Civil War: with Tom Wolfe
Carving Wizards with Tom Wolfe
Country Flat Carving with Tom Wolfe
Creative Canes & Walking Sticks: Carving with Tom Wolfe
Horse Carving: with Tom Wolfe
More Santa Carving with Tom Wolfe
Out to the Ball Game with Tom Wolfe
Power Carving House Spirits with Tom Wolfe
