= Marv Kaisersatt =

American woodcarver

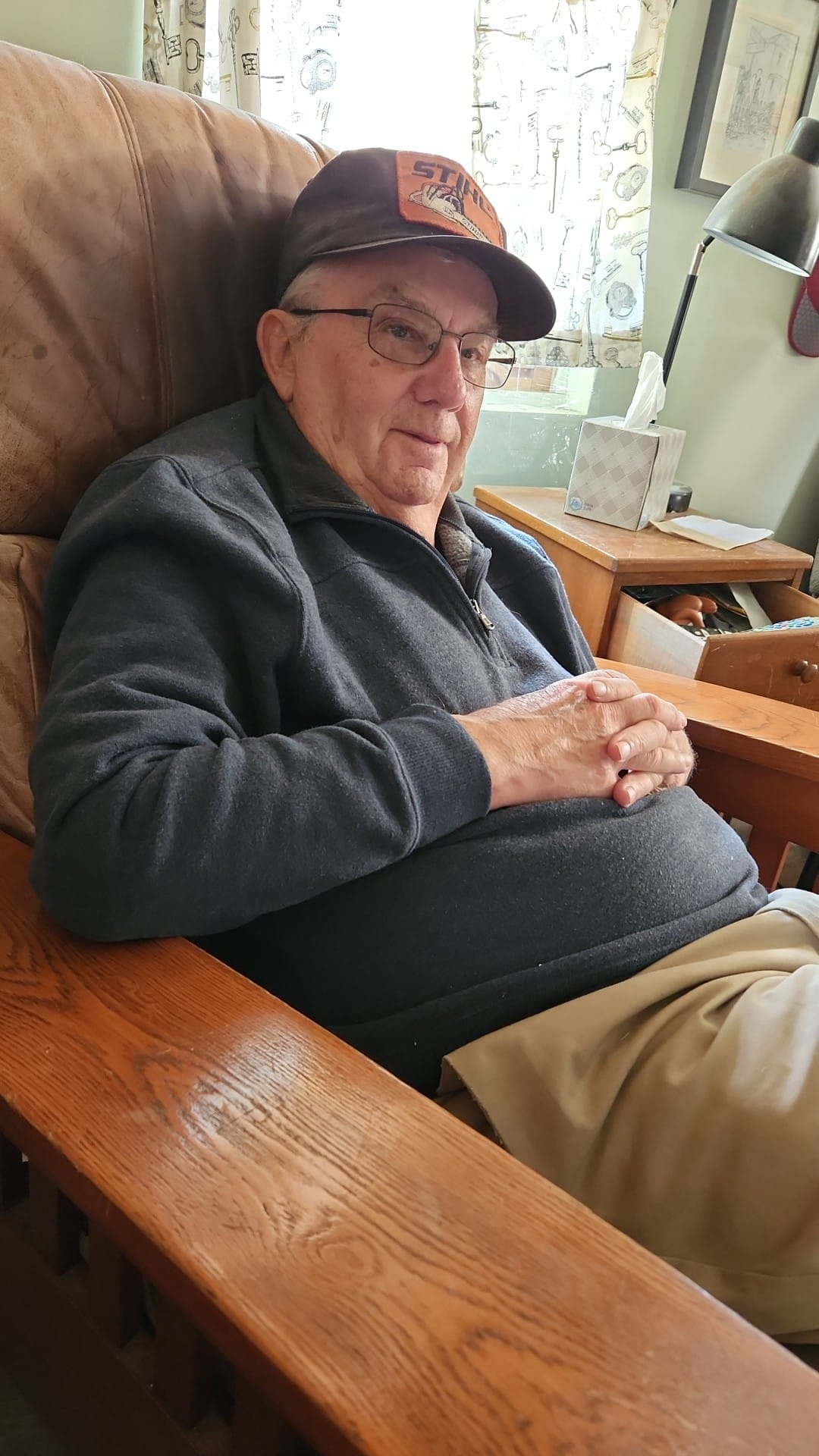
Kaisersatt at home in 2022

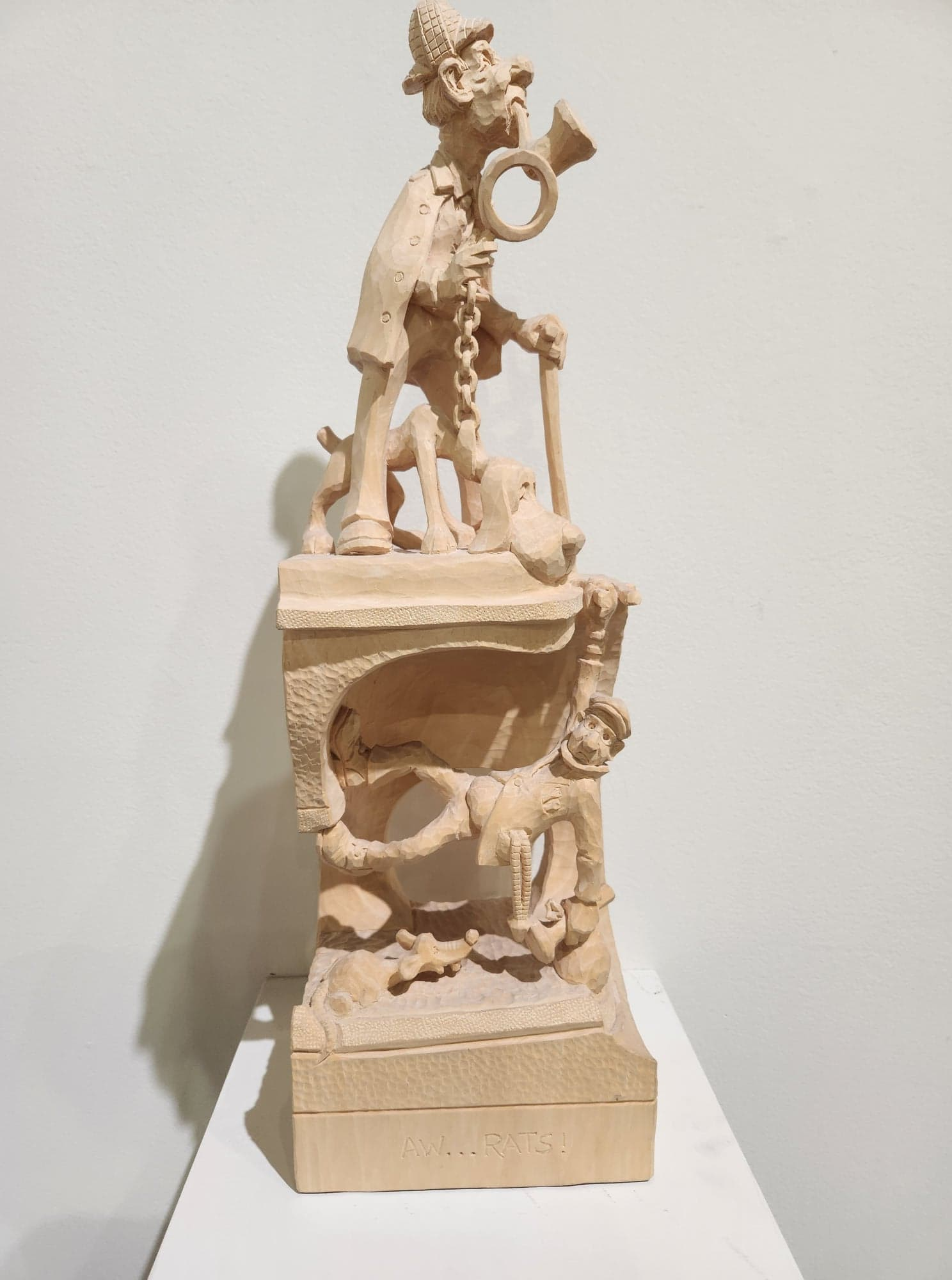
Sherlock Gotya

Marvin Robert Kaisersatt (born 1 February 1939) is an American woodcarver. He was born in Montgomery, Minnesota to Bessie and Benjamin Kaisersatt.

== Career ==
Kaisersatt attended high school in Montgomery, MN and graduated from St. John's University in Collegeville, MN with a degree in Mathematics. He then joined the US Army and spent time overseas before leaving the military to teach math at Escuela San Antonio Abad in Humaca, Puerto Rico. He then moved to Monticello, MN, where he continued to teach before moving to Faribault in 1976, where he taught math until his retirement in 1995.

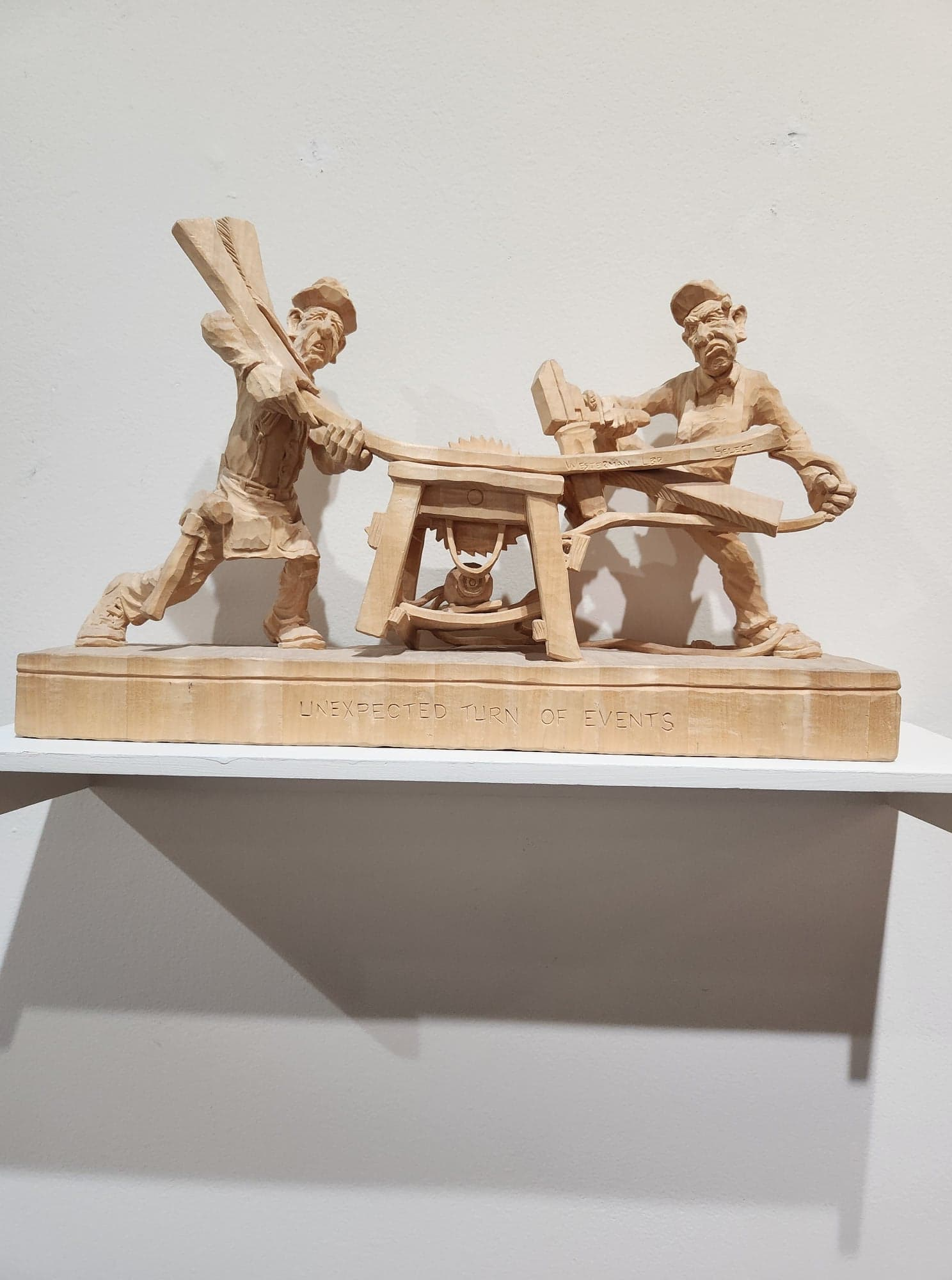
Unexpected Turn of Events

Kaisersatt began wood carving seriously in 1976 during a teacher's strike. A caricature carver, he specializes in carving multi-figure scenes from a single block of basswood. The carvings are finished with sealer but not varnished and presented either without color or with a hand-painted watercolor finish and then waxed.

Kaisersatt has taught classes (held through Whillock Studios and CCA) focusing on design, clay modeling, and carving technique. He is a founding member of the Caricature Carvers of America, dedicated to promoting caricature carving. His favorite caricaturist is Al Hirschfeld. Cartooning and caricatures are prominent in Kaisersatt's designs and story lines. His book, Creating Caricature Heads in Wood and on Paper, explains carving caricature heads and describes a detailed design procedure. Kaisersatt has also authored multiple teaching articles published in Woodcarver's Magazine.

== Awards ==
Kaisersatt's awards include honors from the International Woodcarvers Congress in Davenport, Iowa, where he has won “Best of Caricatures” in 9 consecutive years, the Upper Midwest Woodcarvers Expo in Blue Earth, Minnesota and the Nordic Fest Woodcarving Exhibition in Decorah, Iowa. He was chosen as Wood Carving Illustrated magazine's wood carver of the Year in 2006, and Kaisersatt was featured in the Fall 2007 edition of Woodcarver's Magazine.

- 1991 - Vesterheim Norwegian American Museum, Decora, IA, Gold Medal Award
- 1995 - Vesterheim Norwegian American Museum, Decora, IA, People’s Choice Award
- 2006 - Woodcarving Illustrated Magazine, Woodcarver of the Year
