= William Jesse Ramey =

American carver of Fish decoys and other wood decorative items (1891–1963)

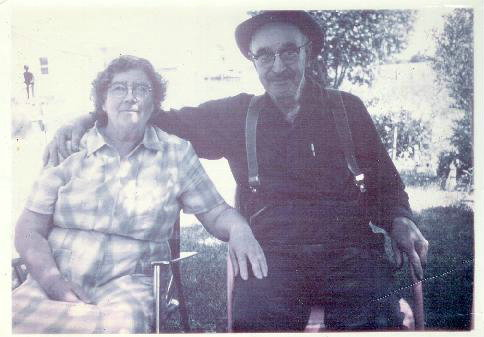
- Ramey (right) with his wife, Gertrude, in 1963
- Born: January 28, 1891; Greenup County, Kentucky, U.S.
- Died: May 26, 1963 (aged 72)
- Spouse: Gertrude May Yager (m. 1910)

William Jesse Ramey (January 28, 1891 – May 26, 1963) was an American vintage master carver of fish decoys. His work is sometimes attributed to "Jess Ramey", though he was known to his friends as Jesse (his actual middle name). His work, along with Oscar W. Peterson's, formed the basis of what is now considered the "Cadillac style".

Ramey primarily carved decoys for himself and some friends. His output was very limited and therefore his pieces are considered fairly rare, even in highly used condition.

His pieces have been seen in the following museum exhibits:

- “Fishing for Art, an Exhibition of the Implements and Art of Angling” American Museum of Fly Fishing at the Addison Gallery of American Art, 3/17/1984 - 4/15/1984
- “Gone Fishin ... an Exhibition of the Art & Artifacts of Angling” - Leelanau Historical Museum 6/11/1989-1/29/1990.
- “Hooked on Wood, The Allure of the Fish Decoy” The Center for Art in Wood, Philadelphia PA 5/12/2012 - 7/21/2012.

== Personal life ==
William Jesse Ramey was born January 28, 1891, to Fleming Ramey and Latisha E Musser Ramey in Greenup County, Kentucky. They moved to Michigan during his childhood. He married Gertrude May Yager in Antrim County on August 11, 1910.

He died on May 26, 1963 from a ruptured appendix.

== Carving ==
Ramey was considered a master woodworker and even taught carving classes at the nearby CCC Camp Wellston where his son (Charlie Ramey) was enrolled. He also carved plaques for family members and a few duck decoys.

He continued to carve until his death. His works are still fairly scarce. His production was mainly for personal usage and for friends and that is possibly why his work is noted for the high level of detail including carving of the gills under the body and the complete painting of all the fins.

== Influence ==
Ramey's fish carvings were primarily carved in the "Cadillac style", although there is a fine example of a large decorative piece on fishdecoy.com which employs an inserted tail. The Cadillac style is one in which a decoy is carved from a single piece of wood in a cradle or "U" shape. The tail is curved, either left or right, so that when attached to a line the fish decoy will "swim" in circles like a wounded fish. Metal fins and line ties are inserted into the wood and are held by the cast lead weights. These metal fins allow the fisherman to bend them so that the swim pattern can be modified. Multiple holes in the line ties allow the fish to swim differently as well since the head may float higher or lower depending upon the position the line is tied. Oscar W. Peterson and Jesse Ramey were among the first to employ this design which became a standard style of the many fish decoy makers in the Cadillac Michigan area. Jim & Al Nelson, Jim Pullen, George Aho, Don Johnson, Delbert Edwards, Arnold "Hook" Peterson, Al Williams, Ken Hill, Tom Richards, Dale Goodrich, and Jerry Finch are just a few of the carvers who have employed the "Cadillac Style".

A number of transitional and contemporary fish decoy carvers have directly attributed Jesse Ramey's work as being an influence on their style. CB Lewis goes so far as to call out Jesse Ramey's influence on his website. Jim Nelson, Al Nelson, Dan Nelson, and Delbert Edwards are all related to Jesse so his influence was probably unavoidable.

It has been said that Jesse Ramey may have been influential to Oscar W. Peterson's work. In describing some of the Ramey decoys in his book, Steven Michaan states:

Produced in the mid 1930s, these sleek, beautifully painted pieces may well have influenced Peterson, since both Ramey and Jim Nelson were considered master carvers by the group.

— Steven Michaan, American Fish Decoys, Page 177

Regardless of the amount of influence, there is no doubt that Jesse Ramey was critical in the development of the "Cadillac Style" of fish decoy carving.

Title	Author	Contains	ISBN
The Fish Decoy Volume II	Art, Brad & Scott Kimball (1987)	Pictures	ISBN 978-0-9604906-5-3
The Fish Decoy Volume III	Art, Brad & Scott Kimball (1993)	Pictures	ISBN 978-1-877771-00-2
Fish and Fowl Decoys of the Great Lakes	Donna Tonelli	Pictures	ISBN 978-0-7643-1643-2
Hooked on Wood - The Allure of the Fish Decoy	Richard "Dick" Walters and Gene Kangas	Pictures	Exhibition catalog for "Hooked on Wood" exhibit May 12-July 21, 2012. The Center For Art in Wood, Philadelphia PA (limited printing)

Title	Magazine	Author (if known)
Hooked on Fish Decoys	Kovels, On Antiques and Collectibles, Newsletter, Vol. 14, No. 8, (April, 1988),	
A very special auction	Woods-N-Waters Dec 2010	Terry McBurney
