= Triggs =

Triggs is a surname. Notable people with the surname include:

- Andrew Triggs (born 1989), American baseball pitcher
- Arthur Bryant Triggs (1868–1936), Australian grazier and collector
- Clarence Triggs (1943–1966), American murder victim
- Gillian Triggs (born 1945), Australian public international law academic
- Glenn Triggs (born 1983), Australian screenwriter, director, producer, editor and music composer
- Harold Triggs (1900–1984), American composer and pianist
- Hayden Triggs (born 1982), New Zealand rugby player
- Inigo Triggs (1876–1923), English country house architect and author
- Jim Triggs (contemporary), American luthier
- Lily Alton-Triggs (born 1998), Australian rower
- Trini Triggs (born 1965), American country musician
- Walter Triggs (1880–?), English footballer
- William Henry Triggs (1855–1934), English-born New Zealand politician

== Other ==
- Triggs, the dog of Irish footballer Roy Keane
- Jackson-Triggs, a Canadian winery
- Trigg's Arkansas Battery, a Confederate Army artillery battery during the American Civil War

== See also ==
- Trigg (disambiguation)
- Trygg (disambiguation)
