= Fish decoy =

Decoy to attract fish

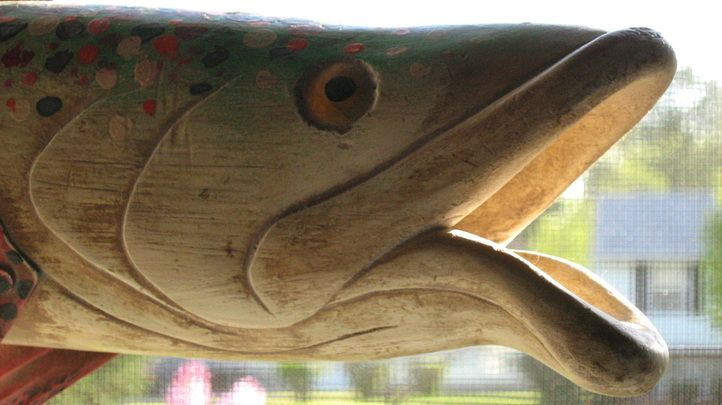
Contemporary carved fish decoy

A fish decoy is an object in the shape of a fish or some other animal that is used as a decoy to attract fish. It is often used during ice fishing, particularly in the American Upper Midwest, upstate New York, and southern Canada. Unlike a fishing lure, a fish decoy usually doesn't have a hook. They have been prized as a form of folk art for as long as they have existed, but have gained popularity and collector value following the Great Depression era.

== History ==
Fishing decoys have a long history in North America, having been used by Indigenous peoples since at least 1000 AD. The first fishing decoys were made from wood, bone, or antlers, but over time wood became the standard material. When Europeans began colonizing the area, they learned the use of fish decoys from the Indigenous peoples, and began carving and using their own. Fur trader Alexander Henry the Elder wrote in his journal in 1762 about how he and his company used fish decoys to fish in the winter near Sault Ste. Marie, Ontario:

"A spearhead of iron is fastened on a pole of about ten feet in length. This instrument is lowered into the water and the fisherman, lying upon his belly with his head under the cabin. He then lets down a figure of a fish carved in wood and filled with lead. Round the middle of the fish-effigy is tied a small packthread; when at the depth of ten fathoms, where it is intended to be employed, it is made, by drawing the string and by the simultaneous pressure of the water, to move forward after the manner of a real fish. Trout and other large fish, deceived by its resemblance, spring forward to seize it: but by a dexterous jerking of the string, it is instantly taken from their reach. The decoy is now drawn near to the surface and the fish takes some time to renew the attack, during which time, the spear is raised and held conveniently for striking. On the return of the fish, the spear is plunged into its back and, the spear being barbed, is drawn out of the water."

== In fishing ==
Fish decoys are primarily used when ice fishing with spears, although fish decoys have been employed during "normal" (non-ice) fishing to attract fish to where a fisherman may have placed several baited lines. Most common forms of fish decoys are weighted and attached to a line. The line is often attached to the roof of the ice shanty (sometimes called a darkhouse or fish house), some other stationary object, or held with a jigging stick. The fisherman will then "swim" or "dangle" the decoy to attract a fish in close enough to spear.

Fish decoys can be used to attract predator fish but also sturgeons.

Another form of decoy that is sometimes used is called a "floater". This type of fish decoy is not weighted, but is attached to a weight that holds the decoy at the desired depth.

There are other fish decoys which have one or more hooks attached. In Minnesota, and some other states, these decoys are illegal and are referred to as "cheaters". In Michigan, a hooked decoy is legal and is simply counted as one of the number of lines that each angler is allowed to employ. These decoys are used since some species of fish, such as pike, are very aggressive and will attack the decoy. The application of hooks provides an additional method to ensure the catch.

== As folk art ==
Given that ice fishing was one of the primary ways to gather food during the harsh winters of northern North America, fish decoys were highly prized by their makers and users. They have been a form of folk art for as long as they have been around, but since the Great Depression era they have especially begun to be valued and collected by makers and enthusiasts. Styles range from basic to photorealistic to stylized with Northern European folk art patterns.

Among notable 20th century fish decoy artists are Gordon Charbeneau, Abe De Hate Sr, Gordon "Pecore" Fox, Hans Janner Sr., David Forton, Yock Meldrom, Larry Joseph Peltier, Oscar W. Peterson, William Jesse Ramey, Tom Schroeder, Harry Seymore, Andy Trombley, and Ted Van DeBossche. These carvers (and numerous others) are considered vintage master carvers because their work predates the modern "collector" phase of fish decoys. Their carvings were primarily intended as tools to aid the fisherman in harvesting fish.
