= Dave Stetson =

American woodcarver

Dave Stetson (born October 19, 1946, in Pittsburg, California) is co-creator and founding member of the Caricature Carvers of America. He served as the first CCA Vice President in 1990 and 1991 and served as president in 1992 and 1993.

He moved to Vermont with his family in 1946, Dave spent his formative years in the country on his grandfather's farm. He lived in Vermont until 1962 and then, at the end of his junior year in high school, his father moved the whole family to Phoenix, Arizona. He teaches woodcarving. He married Michelle Carville.

In 2020, Dave pioneered online woodcarving workshops, becoming one of the first to offer classes on the Woodcarving Academy.
