= Paul E. Koelliker =

American Mormon missionary (1943–2022)

First Quorum of the Seventy
- April 2, 2005 – October 5, 2013
- Called by: Gordon B. Hinckley
- End reason: Designated an emeritus general authority

Emeritus General Authority
- October 5, 2013 – December 7, 2022
- Called by: Thomas S. Monson

Personal details
- Born: Paul Edward Koelliker; March 12, 1943; Pittsburg, California, United States
- Died: December 7, 2022; Salt Lake City, Utah, United States

Paul Edward Koelliker (March 12, 1943 - December 7, 2022) was a general authority of the Church of Jesus Christ of Latter-day Saints (LDS Church) starting in 2005.

== Biography ==
Koelliker was born in Pittsburg, California. As a young man, he was an LDS Church missionary in West Berlin, Germany. He received a bachelor's degree in business administration from the University of Utah in 1969. Koelliker and his wife, Ann Neilson, were parents of seven children.

Koelliker's professional career was largely spent working for the LDS Church, including as secretary to the Presiding Bishopric and as managing director of three church departments (Priesthood, Member and Statistical Records, and Temple departments). He was managing director of the Temple Department from 1997 to 2005, during the large increase in the number of temples built during LDS Church president Gordon B. Hinckley's tenure.

In the LDS Church, Koelliker has been an elders quorum president, bishop, and president of the Salt Lake Hillside Stake. After being appointed to the First Quorum of the Seventy in 2005, he served as Executive Director of the Temple Department and as both a counselor and as president of the church's Africa Southeast Area. In 2011, he was appointed as an Assistant Executive Director in the Family History Department. In October 2013, Koelliker was released from the First Quorum of the Seventy and designated an emeritus general authority.

He died at home on December 7, 2022 at age 79.
