= Nils Trygg =

Swedish woodcarver

Nils Trygg (1914–1951) was one of the recognized masters of twentieth century woodcarving, most famous for the Scandinavian flat-plane style of woodcarving. Nils Trygg was born in Småland, Sweden. He was one of three sons of Carl Johan Trygg and Maria Axelina Andersson. Nils worked with his father carving wooden figures of various common people in the Scandinavian flat-plane style of woodcarving. Between Nils Trygg, his father and two brothers (Lars, and Carl Olaf), they carved over 10,000 figures. Many of his carvings were sold to tourists for approximately US$10. Adjusted for inflation what cost $10 in 1929 would cost $108 in 2005.

== Migrating to Canada ==
Nils Trygg (possibly Nils Johan Trygg), at the age of 13, immigrated to Canada with his mother Maria (43), brother Carl Olof Trygg (17) and an unknown relative, possibly his sister, Kally Maria Trygg (8) arrived in Halifax, Nova Scotia on 7 October 1928. He was proceeded in immigrating by his father Carl Johan who arrived in Halifax on 3 March 1928.

The Trygg family eventually settled in Montreal, Quebec and there they continued to carve. Together they carved thousands of figures in the Scandinavian flat-plane style of woodcarving. Between C. J. Trygg and his sons they carved over 10,000 figures. Many of his carvings were sold to tourists for approximately US$10.00. Adjusted for inflation what cost $10.00 in 1929 would cost $108.05 in 2005.

Trygg was a craftsman in tune to the tourist trade. Trygg generally carved solo figures from basswood or pine, and mounted them on a base. He had a stylized execution with clean cuts, working from a single piece of wood. A highlight of Trygg's carvings is his use of vibrant paint. He often painted his character's clothing in plaid.

== Return to Sweden ==
Carl Johan Trygg and Carl Olof Trygg eventually returned to Sweden, where they continued their careers. Carl Johan died there 1954 and Carl Olaf, based on the dates on his carvings, was producing figures well into the 1980s. It is not clear whether Nils Trygg returned to Sweden or stayed in Montreal

== The legacy ==
=== Trygg family of woodcarvers ===
- Carl Johan Trygg (1877–1954)
- Carl Olof Trygg (1910–1993)
- Nils Johan Trygg (1914–1951)
- Lars Trygg

Trygg family woodcarvings are still sought after today as collectibles. There are over 10,000 carved figures that were manufactured by the members of the Trygg family. Prices range from $50 to $500 depending upon the age, size, and condition of the piece.

=== Identifying Trygg woodcarvings ===
Trygg woodcarvings can be identified by the signatures and dates on the bases.

Signatures commonly found are:

- Trygg carved on base. — Carl Johan Trygg (Generally)
- C.J. Trygg — Carl Johan Trygg
- C.O. Trygg — Carl Olof Trygg
- L. Trygg — Lars Trygg
- N. E. Trygg — Nils Trygg
- Hand Carved by Trygg — Carl Johan Trygg or Carl Olof, Lars, or Nils
- Carved by Trygg Jr. — Carl Olof, Lars, or Nils

Most of the carvings are dated and include the location carved. For example you may find a carving with "C.O. Trygg 1961 Sweden" meaning it was carved by Carl Olof Trygg in 1961 while he was living in Sweden.

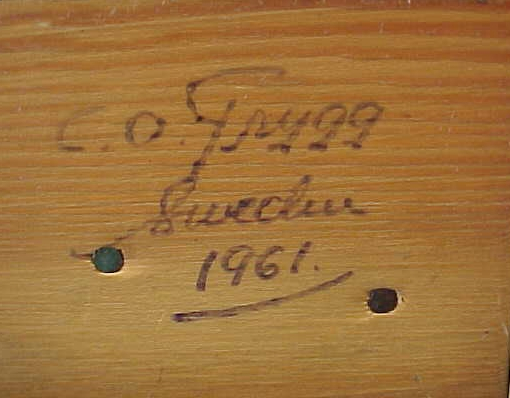
Carl Olof Trygg signature

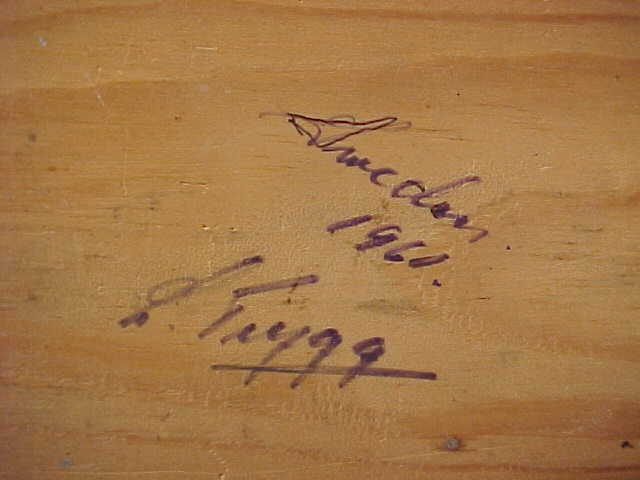
Lars Trygg signature
