= Park Chan-su =

Korean wood sculptor, educator, and museum curator (born 1949)

- Born: 1 July 1949 (age 76); Sancheong, South Gyeongsang Province
- Occupation: Sculptor
- Known for: Buddhist sculpture

- Park Chan-su
- Hangul: 박찬수
- RR: Bak Chansu
- MR: Pak Ch'ansu

Park Chan-su (Korean: 박찬수; a.k.a. Park Changsoo, Moga) is a Korean sculptor in wood, and a museum curator. He is the primary exponent of the Korean style of wood-carving known as mokjogakjang.

Park began wood-carving at the age of 12 to supplement his family's income. A decade or so later he became interested in Buddhist sculpture, and began to specialise in the rediscovery of the traditional mokjogakjang carving techniques used in Buddhist art. He took the Buddhist name Moga, meaning "a tree in bud".

In 1989, he founded the Moga Museum (later the Moga Buddhist Museum) in Yeoju to display traditional handicrafts and Buddhist sculptures and relics. The museum has over 6,000 pieces in its catalogue, many of them Park's own work.

My wood sculptures and I are not separate, but one. I have lived with the belief that I cannot exist without my wood sculptures.

— Park Chan-su

Park has been noted for both the rough-hewn simplicity of his works and for his melding of ancient and modern sculpture techniques. Many of his works have a comic or joyful theme, derived from his Buddhist beliefs. Unusually, he uses a moktak (Buddhist wooden percussion instrument) rather than a hammer or mallet to drive his chisel. Thematically, his carvings tend to be of Buddha or Buddhist subjects, but he is also noted for creating traditional shamanic sculptures such as jangseung totems.

In 1986, Park was awarded the grand prize at the Buddhist Arts Exhibition, and three years later won the President's Prize in the national Traditional Crafts Competition. In 1996, Park and his style of carving were designated Important Intangible Cultural Assets by the Korean Cultural Heritage Organisation. He has also written several books on traditional Korean woodcarving, and runs workshops and classes in which he teaches others the art of mokjogakjang. One of his sculptures is owned by George W. Bush, and is displayed at Bush's Texas ranch.
