= Kate Mosher =

American artist

- Born: Catherine E. Perry; July 11, 1836; Gallatin County, Kentucky
- Died: April 5, 1926 (aged 89); Covington, Kentucky
- Occupation: Woodcarver

Kate E. Perry Mosher (born Catherine E. Perry; July 11, 1836 – April 5, 1926) was an American woodcarving artist.

== Early life ==
Mosher was born in Gallatin County, Kentucky to Fountain and Julia A. (Keene) Perry. During the Civil War, Mosher was a known Confederate sympathizer.

While visiting relatives in Rock Island, Illinois, Mosher witnessed the first arrival of over 5,500 Confederate prisoners in December 1863. In her memoir of that experience she wrote: "Here they stood, hopeless, forlorn, and seemingly forsaken. My heart nearly bursting; the blood was racing and leaping through my veins; my very brain was whirling. My soul reached out in agony and despair." A Union sergeant gave her a letter from a Confederate soldier who said he was a friend of her brother's. She subsequently helped create a network of contacts to deliver letters and packages to the prisoners at Rock Island Prison. Mosher also worked openly with prison officials to bring in food, clothing, and other necessities. Her home became a "safe house" for Confederate prisoners who escaped from the Rock Island prison as well as others from Camp Douglas in Chicago. Although frequently questioned by Union officers about her activities, Mosher was never arrested.

After the war, Mosher was visiting friends in Cincinnati, Ohio. While attending a gala at the Newport Barracks, she contracted meningitis, which led to her becoming completely deaf. Mosher communicated by spelling words with her fingers on her hand. Kate married William Webster Mosher (1834–1897), a produce merchant, Covington City Commissioner, and son of Dr. Stephen Mosher, owner of the Latonia Springs resort. They lived in Covington, Kentucky with William's widowed mother.

== Art education and career ==
Mosher studied with Ohio woodcarver Benn Pitman. Her talent at woodcarving was recognized immediately. Pieces of Mosher's were displayed at several exhibitions, including the 1876 Centennial Exposition in Philadelphia and the 1893 World's Columbian Exposition in Chicago.

In 1877 she was a founding member of the Covington Art Club, a woman's art and literary association.

== Works ==
Although Mosher was very active, many of her pieces remain unidentified, probably in private collections. Among her extant works are ten wall panels and three altar panels in Covington's Trinity Episcopal Church, which she attended. The Kentucky Historical Society has a large oak cabinet, a frame, and a wall pocket.

Mosher created a complete dining set that was first owned by Senator Richard P. Ernst, which he used in his Washington, D.C. home.

== Later life and death ==
In addition to her artistic affiliations, Mosher was active in several Confederate veterans' organizations and helped establish the Henrietta Hunt Morgan Chapter of the United Daughters of the Confederacy in nearby Newport, Kentucky and the Basil Duke Chapter in Fort Thomas, Kentucky.

Mosher died at the home of her niece in Covington on April 5, 1926. She is buried in Spring Grove Cemetery, Cincinnati.

== See also ==
- List of woodcarvers
- History of wood carving
