= HNoMS Trygg =

Two ships of the Royal Norwegian Navy have borne the name HNoMS Trygg. Trygg is Norwegian for safe, secure, dependable:

- HNoMS Trygg (1919) was a Trygg-class torpedo boat launched in 1919, sunk by German aircraft in 1940. Salvaged the same year by the Germans, she was sunk by British aircraft in 1944.
- HNoMS Trygg (P964) was a Storm-class fast patrol boat launched in the 1960s.
