= Harold Enlow =

American woodcarver

Harold Enlow began woodcarving in the 1960s while stationed in Okinawa, Japan. He has become one of America's leading wood carvers. He is a member of Caricature Carvers of America.

== Published works ==
1. Carving Figure Caricatures in the Ozark Style, Harold L. Enlow, 1975 ISBN 0-486-23151-8
2. How to Carve Faces In Driftwood, Harold L. Enlow, 1978 ISBN 1-882475-01-1
3. Learn To Carve Faces & Expressions, Harold L. Enlow, 1980 ISBN 1-882475-03-8
4. Let's Carve Wooden Plaques, Harold L. Enlow, 1977 ISBN 1-882475-00-3
5. "Carve Your Own Hillbillkins," Little People of the Ozarks, Harold L. Enlow, 1979
6. Carving Western Figures, Harold L. Enlow, 1984
7. How to Carve Folk Figures and a Cigar-store Indian, Harold L. Enlow, 1979 ISBN 0-486-23748-6
8. How to Carve Hobos, Harold L. Enlow, 1989
