= Charles W. Trigg =

Mathematics writer and lecturer

Charles Wilderman Trigg (February 7, 1898, Baltimore, Maryland – June 28, 1989, San Diego, California) was a mathematics writer and lecturer for many years at the University of Southern California. He was considered one of the foremost recreational mathematicians of the twentieth century and was the book review editor of the Journal of Recreational Mathematics.

== Education and career ==
Trigg got a B.S. in chemical engineering at Baltimore Polytechnic Institute in 1914, another B.S. in chemical engineering at the University of Pittsburgh in 1917, and an M.A. at the University of Southern California in 1931.

Until 1950 his main field of research was the production of coffee, first at the Mellon Institute in Pittsburgh (1916-1920), and then at King Coffee Products in Detroit. He was granted five patents related to coffee processing.

In 1950 he became a lecturer at the University of Southern California, where he stayed until 1966. In 1967 he wrote his very popular book, Mathematical Quickies: 270 Stimulating Problems with Solutions. A reviewer said, "For the mathematics enthusiast of any age or level of sophisitcation, this stimulating treasury of unusual math problems offers unlimited opportunity for mind-biggling recreation."

== Publications ==
- 1973: "Palindromic Triangular Numbers" (with Raphael Robinson), J. Recr. Math. Vol. 6, pp. 146–147
- 1967: Mathematical Quickies: 270 Stimulating Problems with Solutions, McGraw Hill, 1967, ISBN 0486249492
- 1934: "E69" Amer. Math. Monthly, Vol. 41, No. 5, May, 1934, p. 332
