= Remèr =

A remèr (Venetian dialect, plural remèri) is a craftsman specialised in the making of traditional rowlocks – called fórcolas – and oars for Venetian boats.

== History ==
In September 1307, the Venetian government recognised the first Mariégola dei Remèri, or corporations of specialised craftmen. Remèri were included among the "Arts" corporations, each of which had a school and a governing statute, and together formed the core of Venetian productive power. They were divided between those working for the navy inside the Arsenale and those with independent workshops, crafting oars and rowlocks for smaller ships. Traces of these workshops can still be found today in the street names such as "del Remèr" (Remer's street).

Remeri began their trade as a servente (apprentice, or, more literally, "servant"). Only after many years could they become a maestro, or "master". The long lasting domination of Venice on the Mediterranean Sea mostly depended on the ability of its craftsmen and on the technical innovations they achieved. Even if the main medium of propulsion for a boat was still the sail, the oars and their supports were decisive for manoeuvring during dead calm weather, or along the islands.

== The last remèri ==
The Arte dei Remèri, as a legal corporation, ceased to exist in 1807, when Napoleon abolished all Venetian corporations, along with monasteries, convents, and fraternal orders, and confiscated their property. Only three master remeri remain today; Paolo Brandolisio and Saverio Pastor (who were apprenticed to Giuseppe Carli), and Franco Furlanetto (a former apprentice of Pastor's). The modern El Felze association is dedicated to preserving the crafting traditions of gondolas developed over the centuries.

== Oars ==
The present remo is a very refined version of the old oars used on gondolas and other boats. Initially, it was heavier and made out of a single piece of wood, wide enough to contain the blade, the shape of which is taken from a template. Both the blade and the handle used to be bigger than they are today. The width of modern blades is approximately 15 to 16 centimetres (5.9 to 6.3 in), while the size of the handle differs from rower to rower - the average is around 4.7 centimetres (1.9 in). The underside of an oar is curved in cross-section whereas the top side has an asymmetric edge called the spigolo. This part is called the entràr because it literally “enters” the water. When the oar is rotated through a certain angle, the edge creates friction, and influences the behaviour of the boat.

Today, there are many different techniques for crafting oars. Ramìn is the most commonly used type of wood, because of its low weight and rigidity. A lower weight means less fatigue, and greater rigidity transforms even small movements into propulsive force. It is usually possible to craft a pair of oars from a single piece of wood approximately 5.5 centimetres (2.2 in) thick and 20 centimetres (7.9 in) wide. Another technique uses different kinds of wood for each part of the oar, producing a remo lamellare (layered oar). Tough beech wood is used for the two external parts of the blade, while the part between the entràr and the handle is made of fir wood.

Once crafted, the oar is levelled with a hand plane, and finished, firstly with two coats of oil and treated petroleum, and finally with three coats of special sea-waterproof paint.

== See also ==
- Watercraft rowing

== Bibliography ==
- Caniato, G. (2007). L'Arte Dei Remèri. Verona: Cierre Edizioni. The most recent book on the subject. Text in Italian only.
- Penzo, G. (1997). Fórcole, Remi e Voga alla Veneta. Chioggia: Il Leggio. The most detailed book on the making of rowlocks and oars. Text in Italian and English.
- Pastor, S. (1999). Fórcole. Venezia: Mare di Carta, Chioggia: Il Leggio. A very complete and artistic book on forcolas full of beautiful pictures. Text in Italian and English.
