= Emil Janel =

Swedish artist (1897–1981)

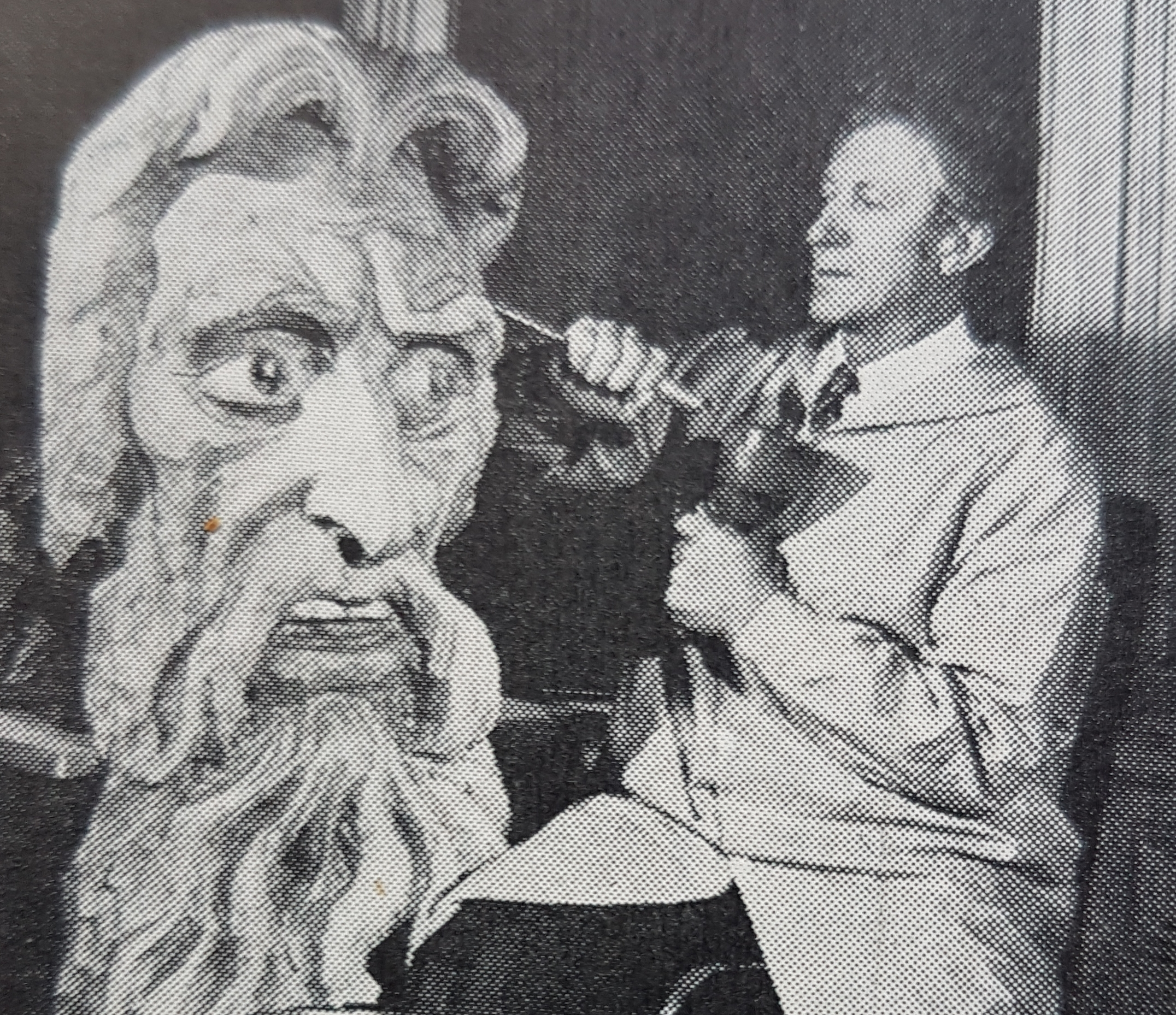
Emil Janel

Emil Janel (21 September 1897 – May 1981) was a Swedish-born, American artist. A still life painter, he is mainly known for his caricatures in the Scandinavian flat-plane style of woodcarving, and is considered by many to be one of the best of this genre.

== Biography ==
Emil Gottfred Janel was born in the village of Hansjö near Orsa in Dalarna County, Sweden. In 1923, Janel moved to Canada, then to Seattle. After some encouragement by a local store keeper, he eventually settled in San Francisco with his wife and began study at what is now the San Francisco Art Institute. During the 1930s, he spent considerable time at Russian River, where he produced carvings of a local species of Alder wood. It is said that he preferred that particular medium because of the similarity to flesh tones, and that he kept his carvings in a bucket of water to keep them wet while working on them. He used very thin aniline dyes on the non-flesh portions of his carvings. Emil is said to have referred to his style as "exaggerated realism".

== Honors ==
- Emil Janel was awarded The Royal Order of Vasa (Kungliga Vasaorden) by the King of Sweden for his artistic contributions in 1965.
- The Maxwell Galleries Collection on Emil Janel contains over 35 carvings which are part of the permanent collection of the American Swedish Institute, They were donated by collector, artist and author Ira Weissman.

== Other sources ==
- Weissman, Ira & John Matthews (1984) Master American Woodcarver - Emil Janel (New York Woodcarving Press) ISBN 9780961343408
- Winnie, Thelma The Little People of Emil Janel (Western Collector Magazine: October 1964)
- Seal, Thomas (1973) The Life and Works of Emil Janel: an Illustrated Essay (Thomas C. Seal)
