= Alexander Grabovetskiy =

Russian-American Master wood carver (born 1973)

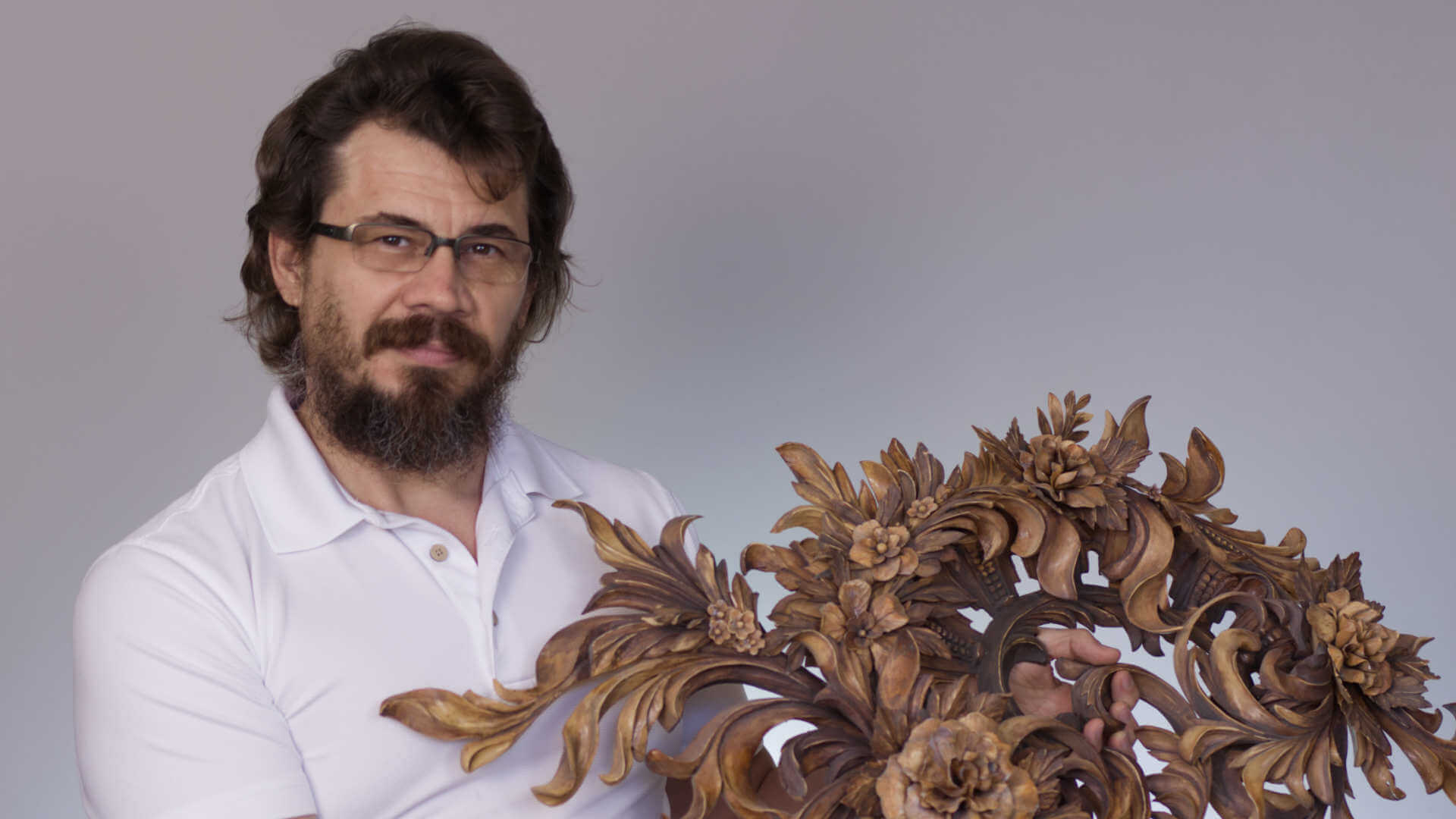
- Grabovetskiy with award-winning piece, Wall Decoration.
- Born: Александр Александрович Грабовецкий; July 4, 1973 (age 52); Dimitrovgrad, Soviet Union
- Citizenship: American
- Occupation: Master Woodcarver
- Known for: Master of Wood Carving arts
- Notable work: Wall decoration Art
- Title: Master
- Spouse: married
- Awards: International Wood Carver of the Year 2012, Best in Category: Art made out wood 2015
- Website: Grabovetskiy.com

Notes
- Founder of Non for Profit School of Wood Carving inc

Alexander Grabovetskiy (born July 4, 1973) is a Russian-American Master wood carver.

Grabovetskiy was recognized as the 2012 International Wood Carver of the year, and his piece Wall Decoration was awarded first place. His work utilizes the same approaches used for centuries by master woodcarvers, including techniques employed by Grinling Gibbons.

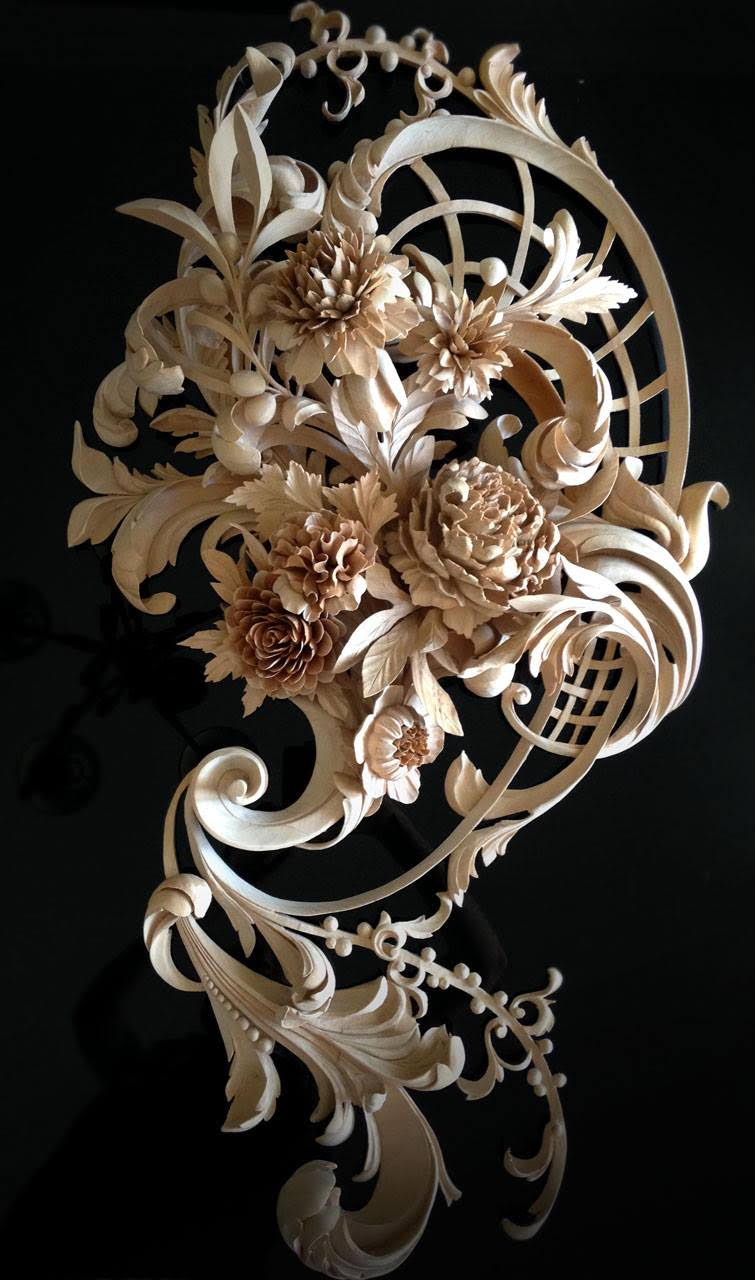
Wood sculpture made by Grabovetskiy

In 2015 Alexander Grabovetskiy was Editors' Choice to be Awarded with Woodworking Excellence in category: Turnings, Carvings & Objets d’Art by Popular Woodworking Magazine.

== Biography ==
Grabovetskiy was born on July 4, 1973, in the Russian town of Dimitrovgrad. His grandfather taught him basic woodcarving techniques at six-years old, and at 16 he was taken on as an apprentice by renowned carver Vladimir Tokarev.

Due to his faith and his refusal to enlist in the Soviet Armed Forces, Grabovetskiy was imprisoned by the Soviet authorities. He was freed after two years as part of an Amnesty International campaign for prisoners of faith incarcerated by the USSR. In prison he began a business making furniture and kitchen sets, and finding no work upon his release at the age of 21 years, he continued on to run his own woodworking enterprise.

In 1996, Grabovetskiy immigrated as a political refugee to the United States together with his wife Nadia and their 10-month-old son. The woodworking and custom home building business that he established in Goshen, Indiana, Aalmark LLC, employed a number of expert craftsmen who were also Christian refugees from the former Soviet Union. He currently works in South Florida.

== Teaching ==
Grabovetskiy teaches woodcarving online and in person at various woodcarving schools.
