= Lars Trygg =

Swedish woodcarver (1929–1999)

- Born: 29 May 1929; Sweden
- Died: 29 June 1999 (aged 70)
- Occupation: woodcarver
- Known for: Scandinavian flat-plane style of woodcarving
- Parents: Carl Johan Trygg (father); Maria Axelina Andersson (mother)

Lars Trygg, woodcarver, (29 May 1929 – 29 June 1999) was one of the recognized masters of 20th century wood carving, most famous for Scandinavian flat-plane style of woodcarving.

== Early years ==
Trygg was born in Sweden. He was one of three children of Carl Johan Trygg and Maria Axelina Andersson. Lars worked with his father carving wooden figures of various common people in the Scandinavian flat-plane style of woodcarving. He immigrated to Canada with his family in the late 1920s. Between Trygg his father and two brothers (Nils, and Carl Olaf), they carved over 10,000 figures. Many of his carvings were sold to tourists for approximately US$10.00. Adjusted for inflation what cost $10.00 in 1929 would cost $108.05 in 2005.

== Return to Sweden ==
Carl Johan Trygg and Carl Olof Trygg eventually returned to Sweden, where they continued their careers. Carl Johan died there 1954 and Carl Olaf, based on the dates on his carvings, was producing figures well into the 1980s. It is not clear whether Lars Trygg returned to Sweden or stayed in Montreal, Quebec, Canada.

== The legacy ==
=== Trygg family of woodcarvers ===
- Carl Johan Trygg (1877–1954)
- Carl Olof Trygg (1910–1993)
- Lars Trygg
- Nils E. Trygg

Trygg family woodcarvings are still sought after today as collectibles. There are over 10,000 carved figures that were manufactured by the members of the Trygg family. Prices range from $50 to $500 depending upon the age, size, and condition of the piece.

=== Identifying Trygg woodcarvings ===
Trygg woodcarvings can be identified by the signatures and dates on the bases.

Signatures commonly found are:

- Trygg carved on base. — Carl Johan Trygg (Generally)
- C.J. Trygg — Carl Johan Trygg
- C.O. Trygg — Carl Olof Trygg
- L. Trygg — Lars Trygg
- N. E. Trygg — Nils Trygg
- Hand Carved by Trygg — Carl Johan Trygg or Carl Olaf, Lars, or Nils
- Carved by Trygg Jr. — Carl Olaf, Lars, or Nils

Most of the carvings are dated and include the location carved. For example, you may find a carving with "C.O. Trygg 1961 Sweden" meaning it was carved by Carl Olof Trygg in 1961 while he was living in Sweden.

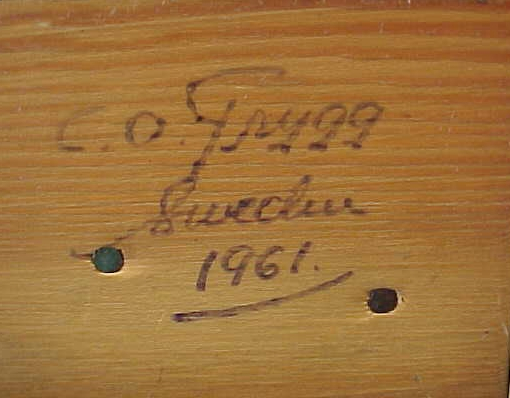
Carl Olof Trygg signature

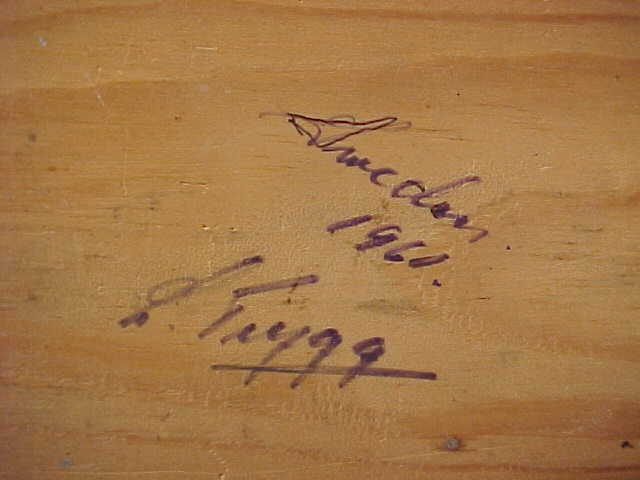
Lars Trygg signature
