= Alexander Pope Jr. =

American painter

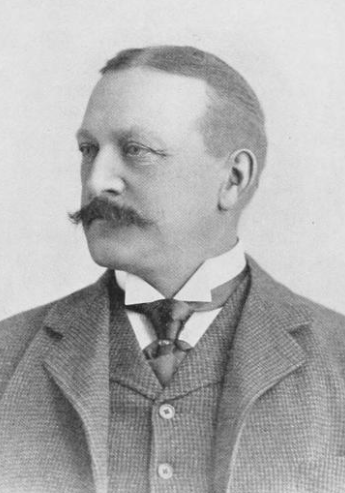
- Born: March 25, 1849; Dorchester, Massachusetts
- Died: September 9, 1924 (aged 75); Hingham, Massachusetts
- Occupation: Artist
- Spouse: Alice Downer (m. 1873)

Alexander Pope Jr. (March 25, 1849 – September 9, 1924) was an American artist, both in paint and wood carving, mostly of sporting and still life subjects. He studied for a short time under the sculptor William Copley, and was one of America's popular gaming artists.

== Biography ==
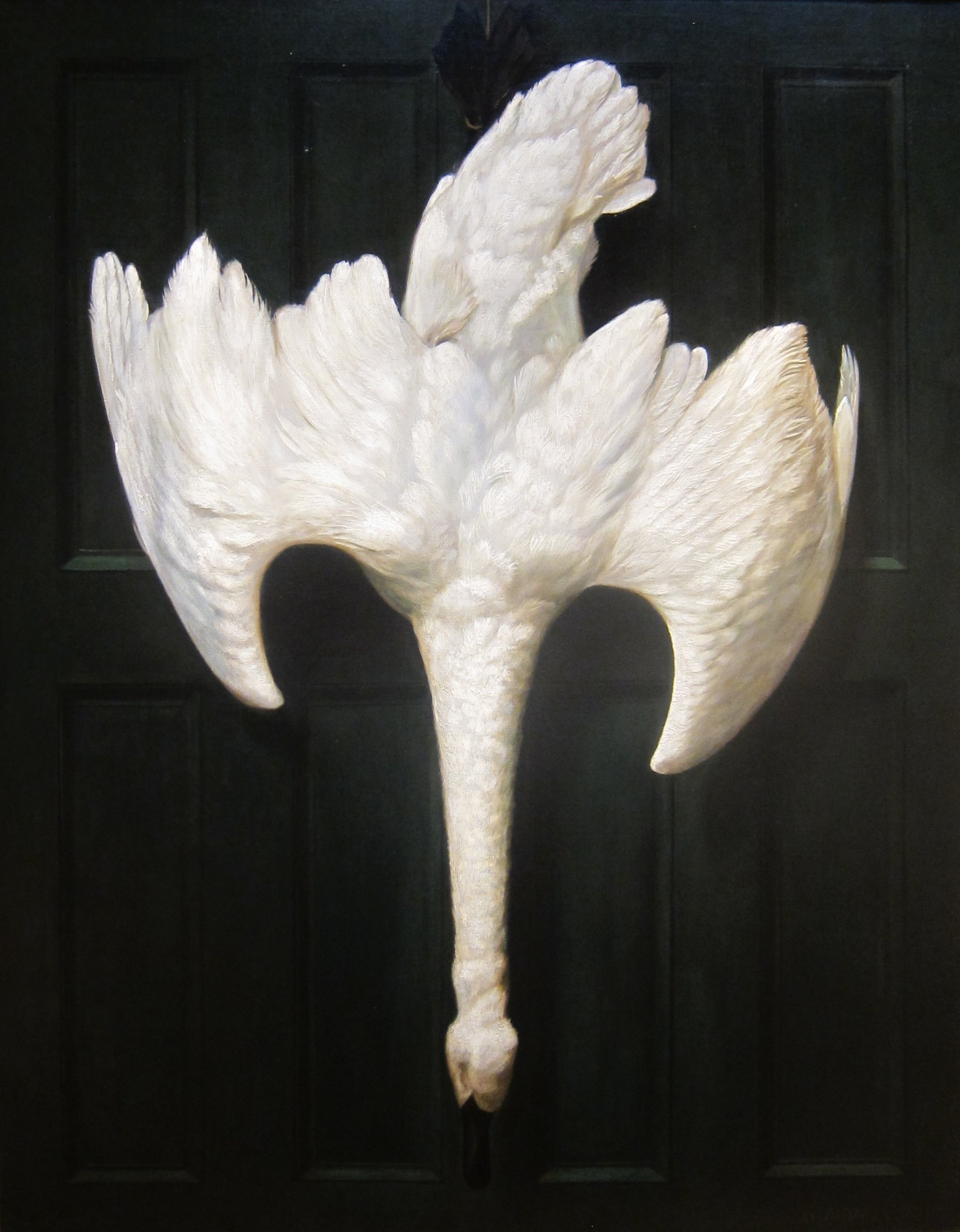
The Wild Swan, 1900 (De Young museum)

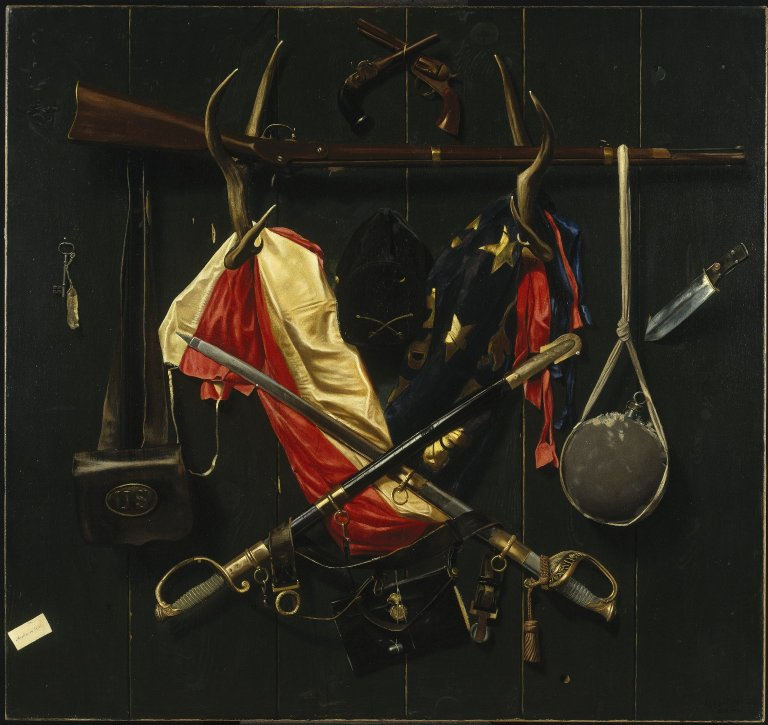
Emblems of the Civil War, Brooklyn Museum

Alexander Pope was born in Dorchester, Massachusetts on March 25, 1849. He graduated from Dorchester High School, and worked for his family's lumber business.

He married Alice Downer on September 16, 1873.

Pope studied with artist William Rimmer in the 1860s. He began carving wildlife in his early twenties, and moved on to painting. He published two sets of chromolithograph versions of his watercolor paintings: Upland Game Birds and Water Fowl of the United States (1878), and Celebrated Dogs of America (1882).

Pope became a member of the Copley Society of Art of Boston after its founding in 1879. In the following years, his animal carvings became popular, with Czar Alexander III of Russia acquiring two of them.

Alexander Pope died from a heart attack in Hingham, Massachusetts on September 9, 1924.

Pope's work is in many private collections and museums, including the Metropolitan Museum of Art, the White House, the Brooklyn Museum, the M.H. De Young Memorial Museum and the National Museum of Wildlife Art.
