= Marko Penov =

Marko Penov (2 October 1922 – 24 March 1998) was a Serbian artistic woodcarver and restorer of artifacts. Born in Titel, Kingdom of Yugoslavia, (now Serbia) and living in Novi Sad, he was of Croatian descent. He was a disciple of Janos Soter. His work included creation of new and restoration of old iconostases and altars for Serbian Orthodox Church, Greek Catholic Church and Roman Catholic Church, churches and monasteries in Serbia, especially monasteries in Fruška Gora, Croatia and Bosnia and Herzegovina, as well as restoration of old and damaged pieces of sacred objects. He has also created cabinets of different styles, such as Baroque, Louis XIV style, Neo-baroque, Neo-rococo and Classicism, such as Biedermeier. He is known for his works on reconstruction of the wooden structures of the church Our Lady of Tekije, also known as Snowy Mary, which is commemorating the Battle of Petrovaradin and visited and used by both Catholic and Orthodox Christian pilgrims. Marko Penov has been also known for restoration of wooden art works in The Name of Mary Church in Novi Sad. He was married to Elizabeta, b. Batrnek (1925-2000).
