= Oscar W. Peterson =

American woodcarver (1887-1951)

Oscar W. "Pelee" Peterson (November 14, 1887 – October 7, 1951) was an American carver of fish decoys.

Oscar "Pelee" Peterson is among the best known and most widely imitated fish carvers.

— Smithsonian American Art Museum, Smithsonian American Art Museum website

His works are the subject of the book - Michigan's Master Carver: Oscar W. Peterson, 1887-1951 by Ronald J. Fritz and can be found in the American Art Museum of the Smithsonian, the Brooklyn Museum and have also been seen in the following exhibits:.

- “Hooked On Carving: Oscar W. Peterson” - Michigan State University Museum, 10/24/1982 - 4/10/1983
- “Fishing for Art, an Exhibition of the Implements and Art of Angling” American Museum of Fly Fishing at the Addison Gallery of American Art, 3/17/1984 - 4/15/1984
- “Gone Fishin ... an Exhibition of the Art & Artifacts of Angling” - Leelanau Historical Museum 6/11/1989-1/29/1990.
- “Beneath the Ice: The Art of the Fish Decoy,“ Museum of American Folk Art 2/15/1990- 4/17/1990

Oscar Peterson was extremely prolific, creating more than 15,000 works of art. (including fish decoys, duck decoys, plaques, and other decorative items). He even obtained a US Patent for a certain style of fishing plug (several of which were sold in a Cadillac MI Auction, 10/3/2010). Estimates are that around 1,500 to 2,000 of his art form are still in existence.

Oscar Peterson pieces show up in many places, one even appeared on the TV Show- Antiques Roadshow from Grand Rapids. Prices for Oscar Peterson's work are often very good, especially on his decorative carvings, with one plaque recently selling for as high as $100,000. His fish have been sold at Sotheby's and have obtained prices over $18,000 for a single piece.

== Biography ==
Oscar Peterson was born November 14, 1887, to Swedish immigrant parents in Grayling, Michigan. He moved to the Cadillac area when he was 8 and spent much of his youth hunting and fishing. He later opened a landscaping business with his brother George.

Although it is not exactly known when he started to carve, it is believed that he started around 1900. He carved decoys and decorative items to supplement his income as a landscaper and general handyman. These decoys he sold from his home as well as in many bait shops around the area. His fish sold not only to the local sportsman, but also many tourists on their way toward Northern Michigan. Oscar approached carving as a business and that is probably the reason for the huge numbers of art that he created.

He continued to make decoys and serve as a fishing and wilderness guide for the rest of his life. Oscar Peterson died on October 7, 1951.

== Influence ==
If a key figure exists in the current resurgence of interest in fish decoys, it is most definitely Oscar "Pelee" Peterson, whose name is synonymous with the field.

— Apfelbaum, Gottlieb, and Michaan, Beneath the Ice, page 24

There is no denying Oscar Peterson's impact on the art form of Fish decoys. Just the sheer number of counterfeits bear out the importance of his work. Oscar's fish were the first known pieces to exhibit the traits that have become known as the "Cadillac style". His brightly colored, somewhat abstractly shaped fish were truly the design of an ingenious self-taught artist.

One of the reasons for the huge popularity of Oscar's decoys is that they were extremely good at attracting fish. Even today, decoy carvers make "honest copies" of Oscar Peterson's fish since they claim that there are times that "nothing else will attract a fish".

== Stylistic changes ==
Collectors often break Oscar Peterson's fish decoy carvings into 5 periods. These periods correspond to changes in the style of carving and painting during his lifetime.

- PERIOD I (1900–1919)

These were his most primitive carvings. His limited production and age of the decoys makes these the most rare of his periods. This is where he began to establish the "Cadillac Style" using streamlined but abstract shapes - very beautifully painted.

- PERIOD II (1920–1924)

Slightly less rare, the carvings become more defined and the painting shows more attention to detail. These carvings become more easily recognized as his signature style.

- PERIOD III (1925–1934)

This was his most creative period with the usage of more detailed carvings and brighter, bolder colors in his paintings. He also begins to add blending and feathering to accentuate his painting on the decoys.

- PERIOD IV (1935–1944)

Although sold commercially previously, Peterson's work begins to become simpler and less ornate as his popularity rose. He began to taper back on his carvings of other "collectable pieces" and focused on carving spearing decoys. The painting on the decoys begin to lose some of the bright colors seen in previous periods.

- PERIOD V (1945–1951)

Peterson concentrated almost entirely on making spearing decoys. The paintings and carvings become much more simple and less detailed as he attempted to make them easier to produce.

== Reference books ==
Books that reference some of Oscar Peterson's work and may contain minor details about his life:

Title	Author	ISBN
The Fish Decoy	Art, Brad & Scott Kimball (1986)	ISBN 978-0-9604906-3-9
The Fish Decoy Volume II	Art, Brad & Scott Kimball (1987)	ISBN 978-0-9604906-5-3
The Fish Decoy Volume III	Art, Brad & Scott Kimball (1993)	ISBN 978-1-877771-00-2
American Fish Decoys	Steven Michaan	ISBN 978-0-9748721-0-0
Michigan's Master Carver Oscar W Peterson	Ronald J Fritz	ISBN 978-0-9604906-4-6
Beneath the Ice	Apfelbaum, Gottieb, and Michaan	ISBN 978-0-525-48529-2
