= Carl Johan Trygg =

Swedish woodcarver

Carl Johan Trygg (1887–1954), formally Carl Johan Thrygg, also knowns as C. J. Trygg, also was a woodcarver and one of the recognized masters of twentieth century woodcarving, most famous for Scandinavian flat-plane style of woodcarving. Between C. J. Trygg and his sons they carved over 10,000 figures. Many of his carvings were sold to tourists for approximately US$10.00. Adjusted for inflation what cost $10.00 in 1929 would cost $108.05 in 2005.

== Early years ==
Carl Johan Trygg was born in 1887 in Skagershult, Örebro County, Sweden. He was one of nine children of S. Sgt Carl Oskar Thrygg. At the age of 12 he left his home to make a living on his own. He worked as a clockmaker, a shoemaker, he also worked in a laundry, and a logging mill. He began carving wooden figures of various common people in the Scandinavian flat-plane style of woodcarving.

He married Maria Axelina Andersson in 1909. A year later she gave birth to their son Carl Olaf Trygg. In 1915 at the age of 28, he had a show of his carvings in Stockholm, Sweden. It was after the success at this show he began wood carving as a full-time career.

== Migrating to Canada ==
Immigration record
- Surname: Trygg
- Given name: Carl Johan
- Age: 40
- Sex: M
- Nationality: Swedish
- Date of arrival: 1928/03/03 (YYYY/MM/DD)
- Port of arrival: Halifax, Nova Scotia
- Ship: DROTTNINGHOLM, Swedish American
- Reference: RG76 - Immigration, series C-1-b
- Volume: 1928 volume 3
- Page: 17
- Microfilm reel: T-14812

Trygg, at the age of 40, immigrated to Canada. He arrived in Halifax, Nova Scotia, Canada on 3 March 1928. Later that year (7 October 1928) his Wife Maria (43), his sons Carl Olof (17) and Nils Johan (13), and his daughter, Kally Maria Trygg (8) arrived in Halifax. Carl Johan and his family eventually settled in Montreal, Quebec, Canada and there they continued to carve.

Carl Johan's three sons, Nils, Lars and Carl Olaf were also woodcarvers. Another relative, Ellen Trygg also carved figures in the flat plane style. Her pieces are few and far between but the hobo motif is the theme of known pieces. Together they carved thousands of figures in the Scandinavian flat-plane style of woodcarving. Between C. J. Trygg and his sons they carved over 10,000 figures. Many of his carvings were sold to tourists for approximately US$10.00. Adjusted for inflation what cost $10.00 in 1929 would cost $108.05 in 2005.

Trygg was a craftsman in tune to the tourist trade. Trygg generally carved solo figures from basswood or pine, and mounted them on a base. He had a stylized execution with clean cuts, working from a single piece of wood. A highlight of Trygg's carvings is his use of vibrant paint. He often painted his character's clothing in plaid.

== Return to Sweden ==
Carl Johan Trygg and Carl Olof Trygg eventually returned to Sweden, where they continued their careers. Carl Johan died there 12 February 1954 in Glimminge, Västra Karup, Sweden and Carl Olof, was producing figures well into the 1980s and he died in 1 March 1993 in Halmstad, Sweden.

== Examples of carvings ==
Woodcarving of a hobo by Carl Johan Trygg circa 1940s

Closeup of face Woodcarving of a hobo by Carl Johan Trygg circa 1940s

== The legacy ==
=== Trygg family of woodcarvers ===
- Carl Johan Trygg (1877–1954)
- Carl Olof Trygg (1910–1993)
- Nils Johan Trygg (1914–1951)
- Lars Trygg

Trygg family wood carvings are still sought after today as collectibles. There are over 10,000 carved figures that were manufactured by the members of the Trygg family. Prices range from $50 to $500 depending upon the age, size, and condition of the piece.

=== Identifying Trygg woodcarvings ===
Trygg woodcarvings can be identified by the signatures and dates on the bases.

Signatures commonly found are:

- Trygg carved on base. — Carl Johan Trygg (Generally)
- C.J. Trygg — Carl Johan Trygg
- C.O. Trygg — Carl Olaf Trygg
- L. Trygg — Lars Trygg
- N. E. Trygg — Nils Trygg
- Hand Carved by Trygg — Carl Johan Trygg or Carl Olaf, Lars, or Nils
- Carved by Trygg Jr. — Carl Olaf, Lars, or Nils

Most of the carvings are dated and include the location carved. For example, you may find a carving with "C.O. Trygg 1961 Sweden" meaning it was carved by Carl Olaf Trygg in 1961 while he was living in Sweden.

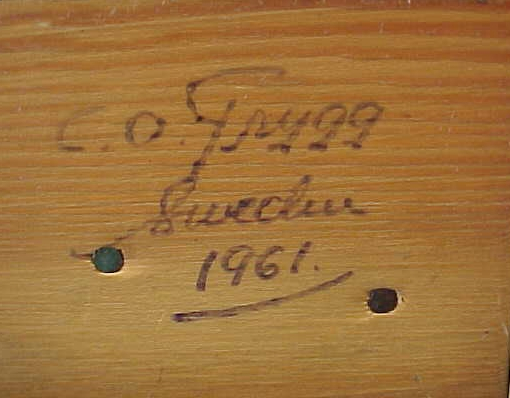
Carl Olaf Trygg signature

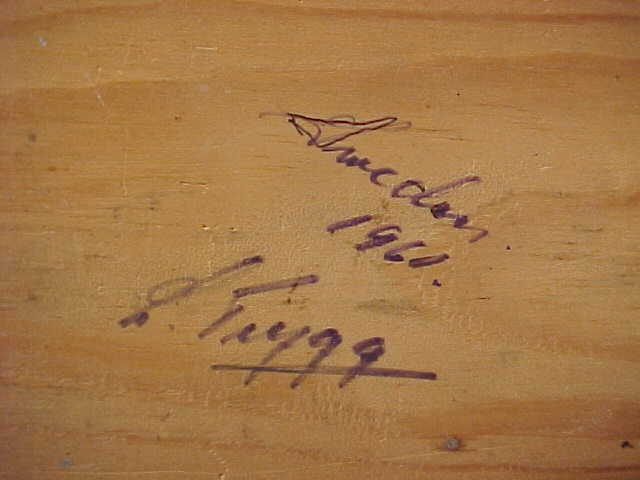
Lars Trygg signature

== Notes ==
1. Carl Johan Trygg was born Carl Johan Thrygg. It is unknown why Carl Johan dropped the "h" from his family name.
2. "Library and Archives Canada". Immigration Records (1925-1935).
