= Scandinavian flat-plane style of woodcarving =

Style of figure carving

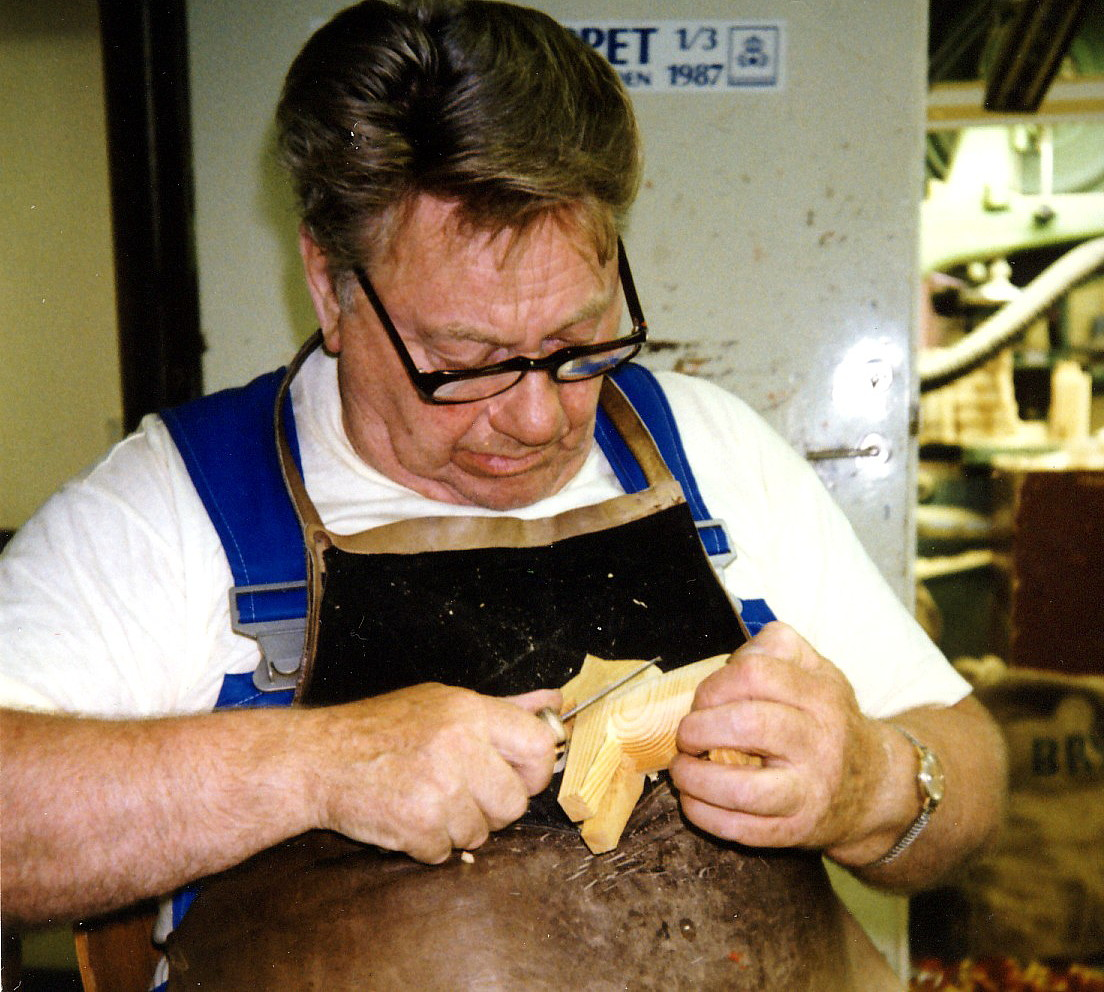
A Dalecarlian horse being carved in this style

The Scandinavian flat-plane style of woodcarving is a style of figure carving. The figures are carved in large flat planes, created primarily using a carving knife. Tool marks are left in the carving and very little (if any) rounding or sanding is done. Emil Janel, a Swedish-born American artist, was considered by many to be one of the best of this genre.

A common example of the style is the Dalecarlian horse, whose distinctive shape is due to this manner of carving.
