= Caricature carving =

Making caricatures out of wood

Making caricatures out of wood is undertaken by some wood carvers. Carved caricatures are noted for having generally exaggerated features.

== Caricature Carvers of America ==
The Caricature Carvers of America (CCA) was founded in 1989. As of 2003 the organization had 25 members.

== General references ==
- "Caricature Carvers of America". About CCA.
- https://www.cca-carvers.org/
