= List of woodturners =

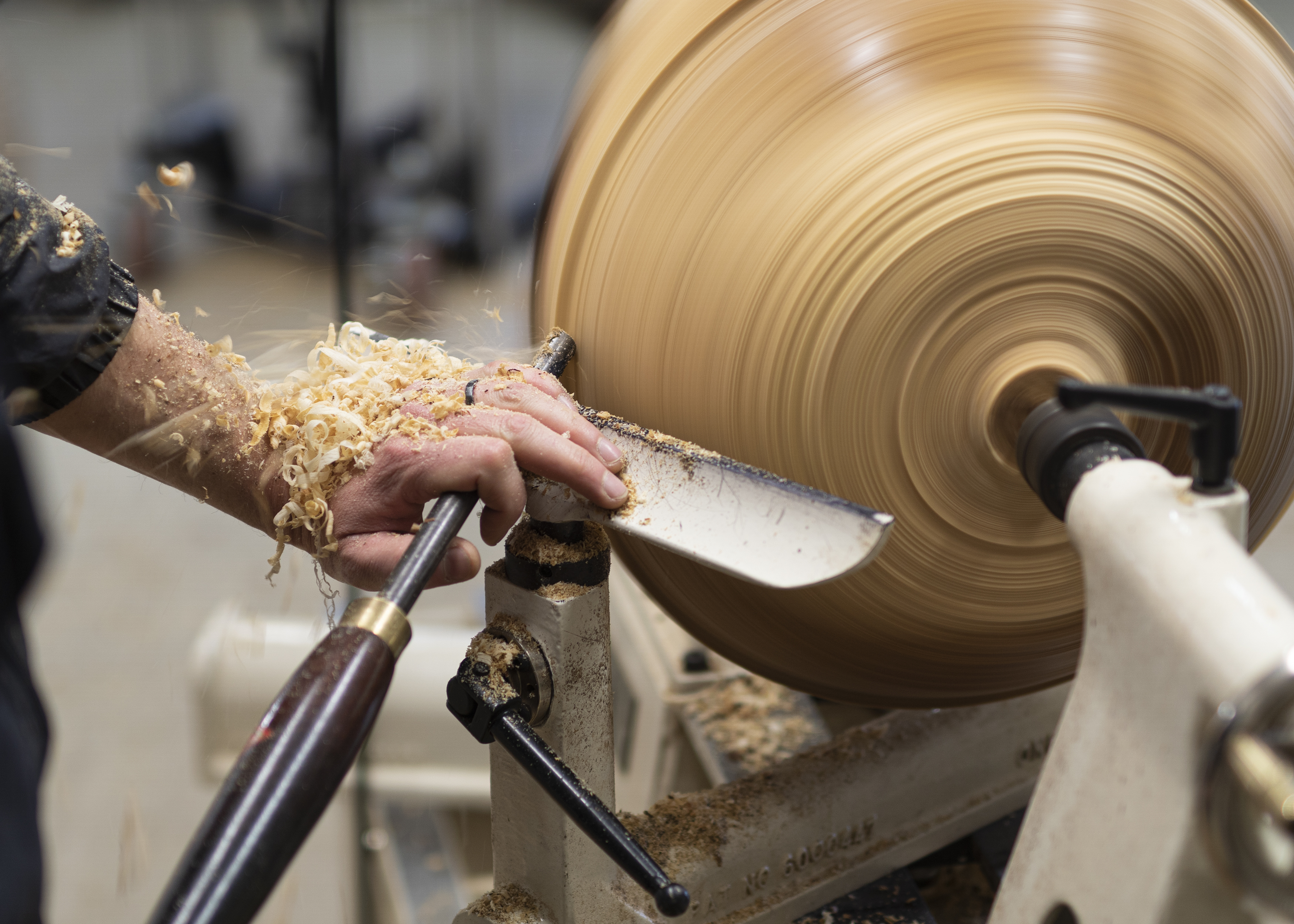
Example of bowl turning

This is a list of woodturners, they are notable people who are known for their woodturning by means of using a pole lathe or a wood lathe with hand-held tools to cut a shape that is symmetrical around the axis of rotation, resulting in a wooden figure or figurine, or in the sculptural ornamentation of a wooden object.

== B ==
- Noeline Brokenshire (1925–2022) New Zealand woodturner, publisher, and sportswoman

== J ==
- John Jordan (1950–2023) American woodturner

== L ==
- George Lailey (1869–1958) British woodturner, noted for his traditional craft of bowl-turning using a pole lathe
- Mark Lindquist (born 1949) American woodturner, ceramicist, author, and photographer
- Mel Lindquist (1911–2000) American woodturner, and engineer

== M ==
- William H. Macy (born 1950) American actor, known for his woodturning
- Bert Marsh (1932–2011) British woodturner
- Moulthrop family, American woodturning family of three generations

== O ==
- Rude Osolnik (1915–2001) American woodturner, author, and educator

== P ==
- Binh Pho (1955–2017) Vietnamese-born American artist known for woodturning

== R ==
- Richard Raffan (born 1943) British-born Australian woodturner, author, and instructor
- Abe Rich (1926–2008) Lithuanian-born Israeli wood craftsman, woodturner, and Holocaust survivor

== S ==
- Jakob Sandtner, 16th century Germany woodturner
- Merryll Saylan (born 1936) American woodturner, known for the application of color in wood art
- Bob Stocksdale (1913–2003) American woodturner

== See also ==
- American studio woodturning movement
- List of sculptors
- List of woodcarvers
- List of people by occupation
