= American Studio Woodturning Movement =

The American Studio Woodturning Movement can be traced back through diverse international movements and schools of thought, including Arts and Crafts, Mingei, Bauhaus and Scandinavian Design. The field was born when a number of individuals, working in different parts of the United States, began to explore design and aesthetics utilizing the ancient process of woodturning.

== History ==
James Prestini was the first of these individuals to come to the public's attention with an exhibition at the Museum of Modern Art in 1949 that featured sculpture, as well as bowls that had more in common with historical approaches to ceramics and glass than work in wood. Others who are credited with pioneering this approach are Mel Lindquist, Ed Moulthrop, Rude Osolnik, Dale Nish and Bob Stocksdale.

In the 1970s, in concert with the Back-to-the-land Movement and Studio Craft Movement, a new generation of individuals entered the field, including David Ellsworth, Giles Gilson, Stephen Hogbin, William Hunter (sculptor) and Mark Lindquist.

In 1986, the American Association of Woodturners was formed to serve the growing amateur and professionals in this burgeoning movement.

Canadian artists Stephen Hogbin and Michael Hosaluk were central to the growth of the international woodturning movement as artists and educators, inspiring individuals in the United Kingdom, Australia, France and Germany to explore their own traditions in light of this new movement. Today, the leading figures in the field are international, while the amateur movement continues to grow.

== See also ==
- List of woodturners
