= Betty Scarpino =

Wood sculptor (born 1949)

- Born: 1949; Wenatchee
- Education: University of Missouri
- Occupations: Sculptor, woodworker
- Website: bettyscarpino.com

Betty Scarpino (born 1949) is an American wood sculptor active in Indianapolis, Indiana. She received the Windgate International Turning Exchange Resident Fellowship two times - once in 1999 and another in 2016 - making her the second person in the residency's history to be chosen twice. In 2020, she was awarded an Honorary Lifetime Member from the American Association of Woodturners (AAW) for her contributions to the advancement of woodturning. Her work is currently in the Smithsonian American Art Museum's collection and The Center for Art in Wood Museum's collection.

== Early life ==
In 1949, Scarpino was born in Wenatchee, Washington. She attended high school in Kalispell, Montana. She graduated from the University of Missouri in 1981 with a Bachelor's degree in industrial design. She has two sons - Sam and Dan - born in 1984 and 1987 respectively.

== Career ==
Scarpino joined the AAW in 1986. She was woodworking out of her garage. From 1990 -1993, she worked as an editor for the American Woodturner, the publication of the American Association of Woodturners. In 1994, Scarpino took as class with woodturner Michael Hosaluk after the AAW awarded her an Educational Opportunity Grant enabling her to take a class at Arrowmont School of Arts and Crafts. At the 1997 World Turning Conference, Scarpino, along with artists Connie Mississippi and Michelle Holzapfel, participated on a panel discussing Women in Woodworking. In 1999, Scarpino was named as one of the six Windgate International Turning Exchange Resident Fellows that year. In that same year she was awarded the Creative Renewal Arts Fellowship by the Indy Arts Council and Lilly Endowment Inc. She was a columnist for the Woodworker’s Journal from 2005 to 2008, when she left Woodworker’s Journal to become the editor of American Woodturner in 2009. From August 11 - November 10, 2013, Scarpino's work was on display in the Indianapolis International Airport in Concourse B. In 2015, she was awarded a Lifetime Achievement Award from the Collectors of Wood Art (CWA).

In 2016, she received another Windgate International Turning Exchange Resident Fellowship where she focused on photojournalism. From April - July 2017, Scarpino's work was displayed in the Smooth: Mangle Boards of Northern Europe & Contemporary Concepts exhibit alongside artists such as Ashley Eriksmoen, Katie Hudnall, and Merryll Saylan. From April 5 - June 1, 2019, her work was a part of the 87th annual juried exhibit of Indiana artists at the Indianapolis Museum of Art. Her work was shown in the 2021 annual juried exhibit of Indiana artists as well. In May 2022, her work was acquired by the Smithsonian Institution for “This Present Moment: Crafting a Better World” exhibit. From September 2 to December 27, 2022, Scarpino's work was exhibited at the American Association of Woodturners Annual Member Exhibition, Bridging the Gap: The Craft and Art of Woodturning in Saint Paul, Minnesota.

== Collections ==
Scarpino's work is held in the permanent collections of the Smithsonian American Art Museum, The Center for Art in Wood Museum, the Museum of Fine Art, Houston, Yale University Art Gallery, and the Minneapolis Institute of Art.
