= Rude (disambiguation) =

Rude may refer to:

- Rudeness, disrespect for and failure to behave within the context of a society or a group of people's social laws or etiquette

== People ==
- Rude (surname)
- Rude Osolnik (1915–2001), American woodturner
- Big Rude Jake (1963–2022; also known as Mr. Rude), Canadian jazz musician

=== Fictional characters ===
- Rude, a member of the fictional "Turks" in the video game Final Fantasy VII and the film Final Fantasy VII: Advent Children; see Characters of the Final Fantasy VII series#Rude
- Mr. Rude, a Mr. Men character; see List of Mr. Men#Mr. Rude

== Places ==
- Rude, Croatia, a village near Samobor
- Rude Pribićke, a village near Krašić, Croatia
- Rüde, a village and a former municipality in Schleswig-Holstein, Germany

== Others ==
- Rude Records, an independent record label
- "Rude" (song), a song by the Canadian group Magic!
- "Rude!", a 2026 song by the South Korean girl group Hearts2Hearts
- Rude (film), a 1995 Canadian film by Clément Virgo
- NOAAS Rude (S 590), originally USC&GS Rude, a survey ship in service in the United States Coast and Geodetic Survey from 1967 to 1970 and in the National Oceanic and Atmospheric Administration from 1970 to 2008
