= Aldermaston Brewery =

Brewery in Berkshire, England

Coordinates: 51.3999°N 1.1373°W

- Industry: Brewing
- Founded: 1770
- Defunct: 1950
- Headquarters: Aldermaston Wharf, Berkshire, England
- Key people: WJ Strange
- Products: Beer

The Aldermaston Brewery (later known as Strange's Brewery) was a brewery located near Aldermaston in Berkshire, UK.

== History ==
The brewery was established at Aldermaston Wharf in 1770, adjacent to the Kennet and Avon Canal. The brewery was bought by Thomas Strange in 1833. William Jeffreys Strange operated the brewery until 1902, after whom it was managed by John J Strange. In 1910, W.J. Strange & Sons was registered as a limited liability company. For many years, the Strange family lived at Bridge House in nearby Mill Lane. The house is now part of the local Steiner school.

In 1922, Strange's bought The Bladebone in Chapel Row for £3,500 (equivalent to approximately £150,000 in 2008). The brewery already rented a part of the Bucklebury estate – including the pub – measuring 16 acres (6.5 ha). The dues for this land were £86 (£3,500 in 2008) per annum.

The brewery supplied ale and stout to The Stocks pub in Beenham.

=== Buy-out ===
The business maintained operations until 1945, when it was bought out by Scrace's Brewery in Southampton and stopped production. The company was acquired by Strong's of Romsey in 1950 and the site was demolished. In 1995, the site of the brewery was built upon in the expansion of Aldermaston Wharf.
