= Eriksmoen =

Eriksmoen is a surname. Notable people with the surname include:

- Ashley Eriksmoen, American-born Australia-based furniture maker, woodworker, artist, and educator
- Mari Eriksmoen (born 1983), Norwegian soprano and opera singer
- Snefrid Eriksmoen (1894–1954), Norwegian politician
