= Robert Still =

English composer (1910-1971)

Robert Still (10 June 1910 – 13 January 1971) was a wide-ranging English composer of tonal music, who made strong use of dissonance. He produced four symphonies and four string quartets. As a songwriter he set words by Byron, Keats and Shelley.

== Education ==
Still was born in London on 10 June 1910 into a family with a strong interest in music. He was a descendant of John Still, bishop of Bath and Wells. Still was educated at Eton College (1923–29) and Trinity College, Oxford, where he graduated in History and French, and then in music. He had a younger brother who died aged 16 and a sister who emigrated to Australia.

At school and at university Still developed a lifelong interest in racquet sports, including real tennis, in which he won a university sporting blue. Both his father and grandfather were solicitors in a long-established London firm, and he had been intended for the law. He studied music at Oxford under Ernest Walker, Sir Hugh Allen and others, and then spent two years at the Royal College of Music under C. H. Kitson, Gordon Jacob and the organist Basil Allchin. He also studied under Wilfred Dunwell at Trinity College of Music (modern harmony and counterpoint) and later in life under Hans Keller.

== Wartime ==
On graduating, Still returned to Eton to teach music. He left in 1938 to become conductor and arranger of the Ballet Trois Arts, a travelling company. Having refused a commission, he spent the Second World War first manning a searchlight in the Cotswolds and then with the Royal Artillery travelling orchestra, which he conducted. He married Elizabeth Westmann in 1944 - at the time she was serving with the Women's Auxiliary Air Force at Bletchley Park as a German translator - and they had four daughters.

== Bucklebury ==
After the war the couple moved to Ampfield, Hampshire and in 1949 to Bucklebury, Berkshire, where he lived at Bucklebury Lodge, Chapel Row. There he devoted himself to composition, working from a studio hut in the garden. Visitors there included Sir Eugene Goossens, Edmund Rubbra, Deryck Cooke, Heather Harper and Myer Fredman. (Note: Myer Fredman: Maestro: Conductor or Metro-Gnome. Reflections from the Rostrum (Brighton, UK: Sussex Academic Press, 2006), p. 51. "A little-known composer, Robert Still, asked me to copy his music, which in due course led to recording a choral work of his for Decca and to conduct[ing] his Third Symphony at the Royal Festival Hall followed by a recording of the same work for the Lyrita Record Edition.") While at Bucklebury Still composed The Ballad of the Bladebone Inn, an orchestral overture inspired by the pub close to his house. Describing a tale explaining the name and sign of the pub, the composition's debut performance was at the Royal Festival Hall on 23 October 1957. Stanley Bayliss described it as "duly bucolic" with "pleasant tunes", but said that it failed to send a "shiver down the spine."

Much of his time in later life was spent giving free advice and lessons to students. His local friends included the composer Anthony Scott (1911-2000, Finzi's only pupil), painter and critic Adrian Stokes, the harpsichordist Michael Thomas (1922-1997) and Newbury Choral Society conductor and pianist John Russell.

== Psychoanalysis ==
As well as music, Still also considered becoming a Freudian lay psychoanalyst. This interest led him to form the London Imago Society in 1956, along with Adrian Stokes. An article by Still on the psychology of Gustav Mahler was published by The American Imago Society. Still presented a radio broadcast for the BBC on this subject in 1964. He also sat on a selection board for Berkshire Education Authority and advised prospective students over a period of 15 years.

== Death ==
Still died of a heart attack on 13 January 1971, having just been elected to the Executive Committee of the Composer's Guild. In an obituary, The Musical Times wrote of him as "a song writer of genuine lyrical impulse [who] set words by Byron, Keats and Shelley; he was also a symphonist, in a conservative vein." His widow Elizabeth died in 2008.

== Music ==
Still's composition remained predominantly tonal, but with strong use of dissonance. Early in his career he wrote songs and a since-lost light opera for the Windsor Operatic Society, for which he was the conductor while still teaching at Eton. His compositions came to include many other songs, four symphonies, violin and piano concertos, four string quartets and other chamber music, three piano sonatas and an opera.

Still's chamber music was recorded by contemporaries such as Frederick Riddle, Eric Harrison and others, and his songs by Heather Harper and John Carol Case. In the mid-1950s, Argo Records recorded a number of his chamber works, including the Quintet for three flutes, violin & cello and the Viola Sonata No 2. His Third Symphony (1960) was submitted to the University of Oxford in 1963, after being championed by Sir Eugene Goossens, the conductor. This earned him an Oxford doctorate in music. Goossens recorded the Symphony in 1966. The single movement Symphony No 4 was composed in 1964 and also recorded, conducted by Myer Fredman.

As a songwriter, he has been described as "in the mainstream of English lyricism, swelled by Dowland, Purcell, Warlock, Vaughan Williams and Gerald Finzi", setting poems by Byron, Keats, Christina Rossetti, Shelley and Masefield. The four string quartets (available in modern recordings by the Villiers Quartet) show a stylist journey from the pre-classical and folk-song models of the first two (only Number 1 was performed during the composer's lifetime, premiered in 1948), to the "without key" polytonality of the second two, which date from the 1960s and show the influence of Bartok and Schoenberg, and of Hans Keller, whose advice Still sought out at this period.

== Legacy ==
Following his death in 1971 his work was neglected. The BBC broadcast his Concerto for String Orchestra in 1979 and his Elegie for baritone, chorus and orchestra in 1990. (The Elegie, originally written for the Newbury Choral Society, is a setting of Matthew Arnold's poem 'A Summer Night'). A number of earlier recordings from the 1960s and 1970s were revived for his centenary in 2010. The "fearsomely difficult" Violin Concerto was revived on 18 May 2013 in Ealing, London.

An archive is held by the British Music Society.

== Selected works ==
Orchestral

- Symphony No 1 in C (1954)
- The Ballad of Bladebourne Inn, overture (1956)
- Symphony No 2 (1956)
- Symphony No 3 in C major (1960)
- Concerto for Strings (1964)
- Symphony No 4 (Sinfonia) (1964)
- Violin Concerto (1969)
- Piano Concerto (1970)
- The Delphic Oracle, orchestral fantasy

Choral

- Elegy (also Elegie) for baritone, chorus and orchestra (1963-4)

Opera

- Oedipus, libretto Adrian Stokes (1950s)

Chamber music

- String Quartet No 1 in A minor (1948)
- String Quartet No 2 in D major
- String Quartet No 3, "without key" (1960s)
- String Quartet No 4, "without key" (1960s)
- Cello Sonata in D minor
- Clarinet Quintet
- Oboe Quartet
- Oboe Sonatina
- Piano Quintet in F major
- Quintet for three flutes, violin and cello
- Trio in D minor for flute, cello and piano
- Trio in A for clarinet, violin and piano (fp 1964)
- Viola Sonata No 1
- Viola Sonata No 2
- Violin Sonata

Piano

- Piano Sonata No 1 in B major (fp 1969)
- Piano Sonata No 2 in G major
- Piano Sonata No 3 in C (fp 1971)
- Other People (ten character sketches), piano suite

Songs

- August (Masefield)
- Awaiting Execution (Chidiock Tichbourne)
- Beauty Bathing (Munday)
- I Fear Thy Kisses, Gentle Maiden (Shelley)
- The Kingfisher (W H Davies)
- Ode to a Skylark (Shelley)
- Shall I, wasting in despair? (George Wither)
- Sister Awake (Anon.)
- Song of Pain and Beauty (Gurney)
- The Poetry of Dress (Robert Herrick)
- The Song of the Sirens (Thomas Browne)
- Sonnet (Keats)
- Sunset on the Morea (Byron)
- The sea hath many thousand sands (Anon.)
- To Julia (Herrick)
- Upon Julia's Clothes (Herrick)
- When I am dead, my dearest (C. Rossetti)
