= Bucklebury Common =

Common in Berkshire, England

Coordinates: 51°25′11.62″N 1°11′42.99″W

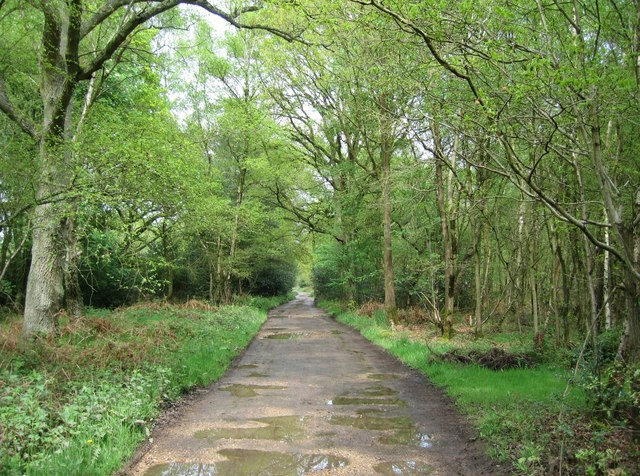
Byway in Bucklebury Common

Bucklebury Common is an elevated common consisting of woodland with a few relatively small clearings in the English county of Berkshire, within the civil parish of Bucklebury centred 3 miles (4.8 km) northeast of Thatcham and encircling the settled localities of Upper Bucklebury and Chapel Row. It is one of the largest commons in Southern England covering 350 hectares (860 acres). Since Inclosure the area is privately owned by the Bucklebury Manor estate, but has public access on a network of public rights of way bolstered by the Countryside and Rights of Way Act 2000.

The Berkshire, Buckinghamshire and Oxfordshire Wildlife Trust assists with management of the estate.

Part of the common is a site of Special Scientific Interest (SSSI) called Briff Lane Meadows
