= The Bladebone Inn =

Pub in Berkshire, England

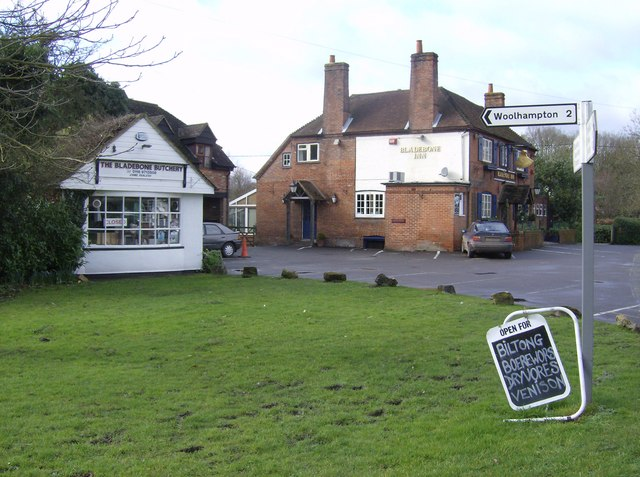
- Interactive map of the The Bladebone Inn area

General information
- Location: Chapel Row, Berkshire, United Kingdom
- Coordinates: 51°25′24″N 1°10′50″W
- Opened: c. 17th century
- Owner: Freehouse

The Bladebone Inn is a public house at Chapel Row in the civil parish of Bucklebury in the English county of Berkshire.

== History ==
Records show that there has been an inn on the site since the mid-17th century. The current red-brick building, however, is undated.

The pub was the location for Courts leet and baron on behalf of Bucklebury manor, and was often part of the Chapel Row Fair. In 1790, the sons of George III attended a prize fight there between "Hooper", one of Lord Barrymore's men, and "Big Ben Brain". The bout lasted almost three-and-a-half hours and 180 rounds, and was eventually called a draw.

=== Name ===
The name comes from the blade bone of a mammoth that was killed by prehistoric hunters. The skeletal remains of the animal were found preserved in the silt of the Kennet Valley; the name "Bladebone" was used to refer to the pub by 1666. The bone is encased in copper and hangs from the front of the pub as the pub sign. The copper casing is regularly repaired, and the bone within has been found to be preserved in an excellent state.

== Ownership ==
In 1922, the pub was bought by Strange's Brewery of Aldermaston for £3,500(equivalent to approximately £150,000 in 2008). The brewery already rented the pub – along with a portion of the Bucklebury estate – for £86 (£3,500 in 2008) per annum. The pub was later owned by Whitbread. It is currently a free house, and regularly stocks ales from the West Berkshire Brewery.

== In the arts ==
In the 1950s, Robert Still composed The Ballad of the Bladebone Inn, inspired by the pub. Describing a tale explaining the name and sign of the pub, the composition's debut performance was at the Royal Festival Hall on 23 October 1957. Stanley Bayliss of The Musical Times described the performance as "duly bucolic" with "pleasant tunes", but saw that it failed to send a "shiver down the spine."
