= Rude boy (disambiguation) =

Rude boy is a subculture that developed in the early 1960s in Jamaica.

Rude boy or Rude boys may also refer to:

== Film and TV ==
- Rude Boy (film), a 1980 film about a roadie for The Clash
- Rudeboy, a fictional website at the center of the 2003-2006 British children's TV series Kerching!
- Rudeboy: The Story of Trojan Records, a 2018 documentary film about Trojan Records by Nicolas Jack Davies

== Sports ==
- Troy Mandaloniz, a.k.a. "Rude Boy", Mixed Martial Artist and contestant on The Ultimate Fighter: Team Hughes vs Team Serra

== Music ==
- Rudeboy, born Patrick Tilon, Dutch rapper formerly of Urban Dance Squad
- The Rude Boys, a 1980s and 1990s R&B/vocal group from Cleveland, Ohio
- Rude Boy Records, a European independent record label
- The Original Rudeboys, Irish acoustic hip-hop band
- Rudeboy (singer), born 1981

=== Albums ===
- Rude Boy, a VHS later DVD, album by The Clash 1980
- Rude Boy, Exuma 1986
- Rude Boy, Horace Andy 1993
- Rude Boy, Lieutenant Stitchie 1993
- The Original Rude Boy, Desmond Dekker 1997
- Rude Boy Ska, Desmond Dekker 2000

=== Songs ===
- "Rude Boy" (Bob Marley song), 1964
- "Rude Boy" (Rihanna song), 2010
- "Rudeboy" (Sigma song), 2013
- "Rude Boy", a song by Mamamoo from Yellow Flower
- "Rude Boy", a song by Quiet Riot from Terrified
- "Rude Boy", a song by Shabba Ranks, written by Danny Browne and Rexton Gordon, from X-tra Naked
- "Rude Boy", a song by Uptones
- "Rudeboy", single by Zeds Dead
- "Rudeboy", by The Very Best from MTMTMK
- "Rudeboy", by Aswad from Aswad vs. the Rhythm Riders
- "Rude Boys (Back In Town)", by Michael Rose from Be Yourself
- "Rude Boys", by Black Kids
- "Staring At The Rude Boys", by The Ruts

== See also ==
- Rude (disambiguation)
