= Scarpino =

Scarpino is a surname. Notable people with that name include;

- Betty Scarpino (born 1949), American sculptor
- Keven Scarpino (active from 1986), American actor
- Ruy Scarpino (1962-2021), Brazilian football manager.

== See also ==
- Scarponi, a surname
