= David Ellsworth =

American woodturner (1944–2025)

- Born: June 25, 1944; Iowa City, Iowa, U.S.
- Died: June 16, 2025 (aged 80)
- Education: University of Colorado Boulder (BFA, MFA)
- Known for: Woodturning, hollow-form vessels
- Notable work: Thin-walled hollow wood vessels
- Awards: Smithsonian Visionary Award (2021), American Craft Council Fellow (2001), James Renwick Alliance Master of the Medium Award (2009)
- Website: ellsworthstudios.com

David Ellsworth (June 25, 1944 – June 16, 2025) was an American woodturner known for his tools and techniques for creating thin-walled hollow wood vessels. He began woodturning in 1958 and later earned both BFA and MFA degrees in sculpture from the University of Colorado, Boulder. His work is in the collections of over 40 museums, including the Metropolitan Museum of Art and the Smithsonian American Art Museum. In recognition of his contributions to the field, he received the Smithsonian Visionary Award in 2021.

== Early life and education ==
Ellsworth was born in Iowa City, Iowa and moved to Boulder, Colorado at age 14. He first encountered woodturning there in 1958 during an eighth-grade industrial arts class, where he crafted a walnut platter for his mother. After high school, he served in the U.S. Army, performing with the Army Air Defense Command Choir for two years and then was stationed for a year in Heidelberg, Germany.

Post-military service, Ellsworth pursued studies in architecture at Washington University in St. Louis (1965–1966) and fine arts at the New School for Social Research in New York City (1966–1970). He earned a Bachelor of Fine Arts in sculpture in 1971 and a Master of Fine Arts in 1973 from the University of Colorado at Boulder. During his graduate studies, he explored various media, including ceramics, cast metals, and polyester resin, which informed his later approach to woodturning.

== Career and innovations ==
In 1974, Ellsworth was hired by ceramicist Paul Soldner to establish the woodworking program at the Anderson Ranch Arts Center in Snowmass Village, Colorado. The following year, he opened his first private woodturning studio in Boulder, Colorado. During this period, he developed specialized bent turning tools and techniques for creating thin-walled hollow forms, a method he termed "blind turning." This innovation allowed for the creation of vessels with walls as thin as 1/16 inch, extending possibilities within woodturning.

== Teaching and influence ==
Ellsworth has taught at Anderson Ranch, Arrowmont School of Arts and Crafts, and Penland School of Craft. In 1990, he founded the Ellsworth School of Woodturning in Bucks County, Pennsylvania, later relocating it to Weaverville, North Carolina, in 2017.

Ellsworth was a founding member of the American Association of Woodturners (AAW) and served as its first president from 1986 to 1990.

== Artistic style and philosophy ==
Ellsworth's work is characterized by minimalist forms that emphasize the natural beauty of wood. His vessels often feature narrow openings and delicate walls, challenging traditional notions of functionality. He draws inspiration from Native American pottery, particularly the works of Hopi-Tewa potter Nampeyo, the architecture of the American Southwest, and the inherent qualities of wood, which he describes as "the most perfectly imperfect material to work with."

== Series ==
After starting out in the 1970s turning functional wooden items such as salt, pepper, and sugar containers, Ellsworth shifted to artistic hollow form bowls, then vessels, and finally to work in artistic series for the rest of his career. His major series include Spheres, Spirit Forms, Black Pots, the Solstice Series of wood sculptures, and the Emergence Series.

== Collections ==
David Ellsworth's wood-turned vessels and sculptures are in the permanent collections of numerous museums.

Museums in the United States

- Metropolitan Museum of Art, New York, NY
- Philadelphia Museum of Art, Philadelphia, PA
- Museum of Fine Arts, Boston, MA
- Los Angeles County Museum of Art (LACMA), Los Angeles, CA
- Smithsonian American Art Museum – Renwick Gallery, Washington, D.C.
- Museum of Arts and Design (MAD), New York, NY
- High Museum of Art, Atlanta, GA
- Denver Art Museum, Denver, CO
- Detroit Institute of Arts, Detroit, MI
- Minneapolis Institute of Art, Minneapolis, MN
- Crocker Art Museum, Sacramento, CA
- Currier Museum of Art, Manchester, NH
- Fuller Craft Museum, Brockton, MA
- Mint Museum of Art + Design, Charlotte, NC
- Museum of Fine Arts, Houston, TX
- Museum of Fine Arts, Arizona State University, Tempe, AZ
- Sheldon Museum of Art, Lincoln, NE
- University of Michigan Museum of Art, Ann Arbor, MI
- Yale University Art Gallery, New Haven, CT
- Racine Art Museum, Racine, WI
- Museum for Art in Wood, Philadelphia, PA
- Allentown Art Museum, Allentown, PA
- Arkansas Arts Center, Little Rock, AR
- Asheville Art Museum, Asheville, NC
- Carnegie Museum of Art, Pittsburgh, PA
- Cedar Rapids Museum of Art, Cedar Rapids, IA
- Cincinnati Art Museum, Cincinnati, OH
- Columbus Museum of Art, Columbus, GA
- Long Beach Museum of Art, Long Beach, CA
- Mobile Museum of Art, Mobile, AL
- Peabody Essex Museum, Salem, MA
- Westum Museum of Fine Arts, Racine, WI
- World Forestry Center Museum, Portland, OR
- White House Collection of American Crafts, Washington, D.C.

International Collections

- Victoria and Albert Museum, London, UK
- Musée des Arts Décoratifs, Paris, France
- Kunstindustrimuseet (Museum of Decorative Arts), Copenhagen, Denmark

== Exhibitions ==
David Ellsworth's wood art has been in numerous exhibitions across the United States:

=== Museum exhibits ===
- American Craft Museum
  - "Craft America-Poetry Of The Physical." 1987
  - "The Art Of Woodturning." 1983
  - "Tea Service." 1993
  - "New Acquisitions". 1999
  - "Expressions In Wood: The Wornick Collection".1998
- Arkansas Arts Center - "Moving Beyond Tradition: A Turned-wood Invitational". Little Rock, AR 1997
- Museum of Fine Arts, Arizona State University - "Turned Wood Now: Redefining The Lathe Turned Object". Tempe, AZ 1995, 1997
- Bishop Museum Of Fine Arts - "Hawaii Craftsmen", Honolulu, HI. 1986, 1997
- Museum For Art In Wood - "Eight ACC Fellows". October, Phila, PA
- Corning Museum Of Glass - "Woodturning." Corning, New York. 1979
- Craft & Folk Art Museum - "The Vessel: Studies In Form & Media", Los Angeles, CA. 1989
- Fine Arts Museums Of San Francisco — "Contemporary Works From The Saxe Collection San Francisco, CA. 1999
- Greenville County Museum Of Art - "Gallery Of Turned Objects." Greenville, SC. 1982
- High Museum Of Art
  - "By The Hand:Twentieth Century Crafts". Atlanta, GA. 1990
  - "Shop Traditions/studio Expressions". Atlanta, GA. 1988
  - "Permanent Collection". Atlanta, GA. 1993
- Hunterdon Museum Of Art - Clinton, Nj. 2018
- Huntington Museum Of Art - "New Masters Workshop". Huntington, Wv. 1991
- James A. Michener Art Museum - "In Our Circle". Doylestown, Pa. 1991
- Jesse Besser Museum Of Art - Alpena, MI. 1985
- Kunstindustrie Museum Of Art - "Celebrating American Craft". Copenhagen, Denmark. 1997
- Mitchell Museum - "Past & Present: Ongoing Traditions In American Craft Art." Mt. Vernon, IL. 1993
- Monmouth Museum - "Contemporary Arts: An Expanding View". Lincroft, NJ. 1986
- Musee Des Arts Decoratifs - "Crafts Today Usa" Paris, France. 1989
- Museum Of Art - "Aha Hana Lima". Honolulu, HI. 1997
- National Gallery Of American Art - "The White House Craft Collection", Smithsonian Institution, Washington, D.C., 1995
- Nueberger Museum Of Art - "Jacobson Collection", Suny, Purchase, NY. 1993
- Oakland Museum Of California - "Expressions In Wood: Masterworks From The Wornick Collection". Oakland, CA. 1997
- Peabody Essex Museum Of Art - Salem, MA
- Philadelphia Museum Of Art - "Vessel" Philadelphia, PA. 1989
- Port Of History Museum - "International Turned Objects Show." Philadelphia, Pa. 1988
- Port Of History Museum - "Challenge IV". Philadellphia, PA. 1991
- Renwick Gallery of the Smithsonian Institution - "The Art of Turned Wood Bowls" Washington, D.C. 1986
- Renwick Gallery Of The Smithsonian Institution - "Renwick At 25", Washington, D.C. 1997
- Sheldon Memorial Art Museum - Lincoln, Ne. 1979
- SOFA Chicago - November 6–8. William Zimmer Gallery
- Georgia Museum of Art & Heritage - "From Ancient Craft to Fine Art". Tifton, GA. 1997
- Trenton City Museum Of Art - "The Forest Refined." Trenton, NJ. 1992
- Woodmere Art Museum - "Pennsylvania Lathe-turned Objects: 1700-1990". Philadelphia, PA. 1999

=== Solo exhibits ===
- Bellas Artes Gallery - New York City, NY. 1991
- Bellas Artes Gallery - Santa Fe, NM. 1989
- Cooper-lynn Gallery - New York City, NY, 1985
- Del Mano Gallery - Los Angeles, CA. 1997, 2000
- Great American Gallery - Atlanta, GA. 1984, 1987
- Hand And Spirit Gallery - Scottsdale, AZ. 1994
- Hunterdon Museum Of Art - Clinton, NJ. 2018
- Materia Gallery — Scottsdale, AZ. 1999
- Mendelson Gallery - Washington, CT. 1992, 1997
- Metropolitan State College - Denver, CO. 1973
- Okun Gallery - Santa Fe, NM. 1995
- Pritam & Eames - Easthampton, NY. 1983
- Pro Art Gallery - St. Louis, MO. 1988
- Sheldon Memorial Art Museum - Lincoln, NE. 1979

== Awards and recognition ==
Ellsworth has received several awards, including:

- National Endowment for the Arts Fellowship
- Pennsylvania Council for the Arts Fellowship
- PEW Fellowship for the Arts
- Honorary Lifetime Member, American Association of Woodturners.
- College of Fellows, American Craft Council
- James A. Renwick Alliance "Master of the Medium" Award (2009)
- Smithsonian Institution's Visionary Award (2021)

== Publications and media ==
Ellsworth published the first article on hollow-form turning in Fine Woodworking magazine in 1979. He published an article on turning a pool cue under the pseudonym "Colorado Slim" in 1986. Ellsworth has written numerous tips, shop notes, and short articles for the publications of the American Association of Woodturners including American Woodturner magazine.

In 2008, Ellsworth published the book "Ellsworth on Woodturning: How a Master Creates Bowls, Pots, and Vessels," offering insights into his techniques and philosophy. He has also produced instructional videos covering various aspects of woodturning, including tool use, shop setup, and hollow-form creation.

== Personal life ==
Ellsworth met his wife, Wendy (Neel), an accomplished bead artist, in Colorado in 1975; they married in 1980. The couple resides in Weaverville, North Carolina, where they continue to engage in their respective artistic practices and collaborate on occasion.

In 2025, Ellsworth would pass away from a short unspecified illness. Craig Edelbrock, a biographer and fellow woodworker, would establish the David Ellsworth Legacy Project in 2024; this project, made up of Dan Saal, Glenn Adamson, and Edelbrock, is currently responsible for archival and tributes to Ellsworth's life and woodturning legacy. Along with this, the Project is set to publish a book entitled David Ellsworth: The Spirit of Woodturning, featuring a biography (presumably from Edelbrock), short essay (from Adamson), and a selected photo gallery of his works, as well as a special chapter highlighting artists "inspired and influenced by David and his work."
