= Michelle Holzapfel =

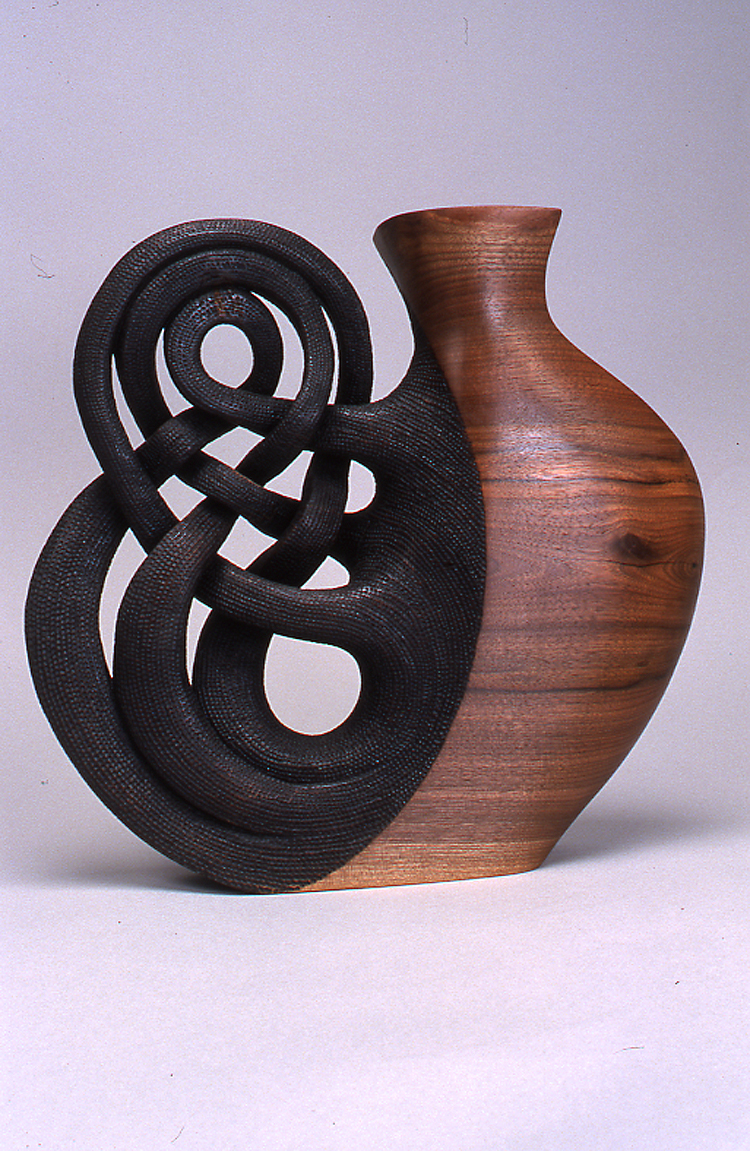

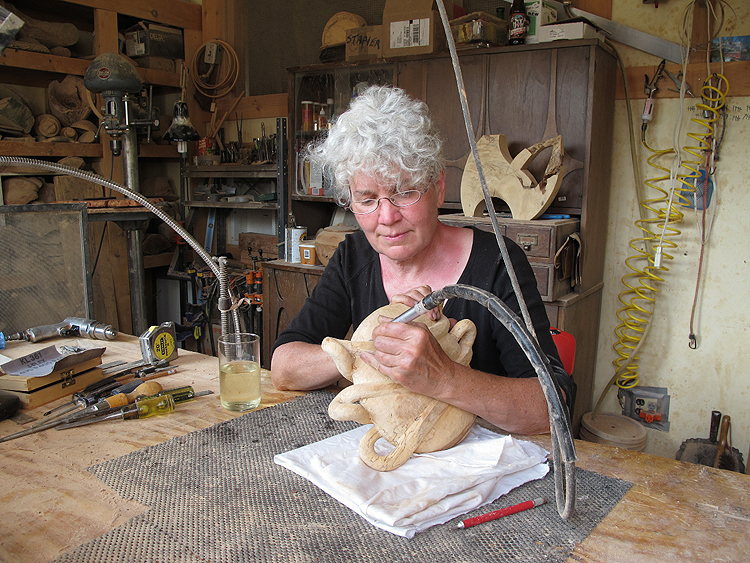

Michelle Holzapfel (born Michelle Chasse on December 9, 1951) is an American woodturner and a participant in the American Craft movement. She has five decades of experience turning and carving native hardwoods in Marlboro, Vermont, where she has lived her adult life. Holzapfel fits the definitions of both Studio artist and Material movement artist. A product of the revolutionary back-to-the-earth movement of 1960s and 1970s, she attributes the expressiveness of her turned and carved forms to the idealism of those years. Raised in rural Rhode Island, she has worked alone in her Vermont studio—shared only with her husband, the furniture maker and educator David Holzapfel—since 1976. Her wood pieces which feature intricate carvings have been exhibited in museums and galleries in the U.S., Australia and Europe. Publications featuring her work include but are not limited to House Beautiful, American Craft, Woodworking, and Fine Woodworking.

== Early life ==
Born in Woonsocket, Rhode Island to French-Canadian parents, the third of six children. How she does what she does, was greatly influenced by growing up in a family with six kids. Her father, a tool and die maker, taught her about tools and problem solving. From her mother, a seamstress, she learned that doing something by hand puts information into your fingers. In high school art classes, she experimented with linoleum prints, then woodblocks, eventually discovering that she enjoyed the woodcarving more than the printing. She attended Marlboro College in 1969 and became a self-taught wood turner and carver. She married David Holzapfel and they had three children: Simon Holzapfel, Forrest Holzapfel, and Ada Holzapfel (deceased).

== Artistic career ==
Holzapfel’s trajectory parallels that of many makers of the period: she first sold work out of her studio, exhibited in the 1980s at small to modest craft fairs, and then at venues such as the American Craft Council shows in Baltimore and Springfield, Massachusetts, and the Philadelphia Craft Show. As the gallery system for contemporary crafts developed in the 1980s, dealers such as Betty Tinlot of Ten Arrow Gallery in Cambridge, Massachusetts; Ruth and Rick Snyderman of The Works Gallery in Philadelphia; and Bebe Pritam and Warren Eames Johnson of Pritam & Eames on Long Island discovered Holzapfel and gave her gallery exposure. She was one of the first turners featured at Philadelphia’s prestigious Wood Turning Center (now The Center for Art In Wood), where she remains an active participant. By 1991, Holzapfel was the only turner to be highlighted in the distinguished Peter Joseph Gallery in New York that specialized in handcrafted furniture. After the gallery closed in 1997, Holzapfel’s work was sold by such highly respected dealers as Barry Friedman Ltd. in New York and the Connell Gallery in Atlanta. Holzapfel is currently represented by Mitchell-Giddings Fine Art in Brattleboro, Vermont.

== Artistic style ==
“I do not simply rely on the physical beauty of the burl, but see it in combination with its form. The form of a piece is informed by the inherent structure of the wood.”

Holzapfel uses the materials, tools and techniques of woodworking to render images from daily life: textile, plant, animal and human forms. Her pieces emphasize the tactile aspect of wood: from smoothly pleated forms and carved basketweave motifs to corduroy-textured surfaces. These efforts honor the spirit of her artisan ancestry while still recognizing the changing nature of modern human culture.

Holzapfel’s work deals with materiality but in unexpected ways. Several of her series actually mimic the textures of textiles, knitted fabrics, and baskets. On a more fundamental level, however, unlike many turners whose work celebrates the sensuality of the grain, Holzapfel goes beyond the surface patterns of her source materials: the crotches where branches emerge from tree trunks, spalted woods, and, most often, burls (rounded growths on trees characterized by abnormal grain patterns).

Usually, the sculptures emerge from a single block of wood, primarily a local Vermont hardwood such as maple, birch, cherry, walnut, or beech, brought to Holzapfel by local loggers. At times, she turns the wood on the lathe to delineate its basic shape; other times, she uses the lathe simply as a carving tool. In general, she carves and manipulates the wood using techniques such as stippling, bleaching, burning, furrowing, and gouging to create rich repeat patterns, distinctive areas of light and shadow, and, most surprisingly, the illusion of assemblage.

== Recent solo exhibitions ==
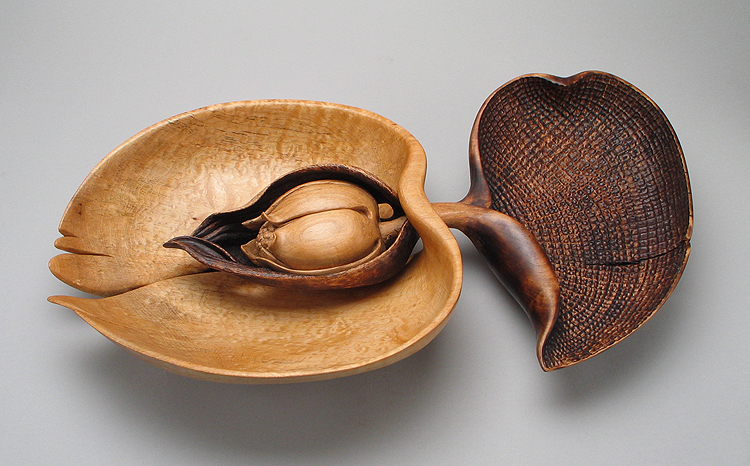

2015 -“True to Form,” Drury Gallery at Marlboro College, Marlboro, VT

2014 -“From what’s at Hand,” in “The Stories We Tell.” Fuller Craft Museum, Brockton, MA

2009 -“Lost & Found”- del mano Gallery, Los Angeles, CA

2004 -”Michelle Holzapfel”- del mano Gallery, Los Angeles, CA

-“Full Circle”- Brattleboro Museum and Art Center, Brattleboro, VT

2003 -” In the Shape of a Vessel”- Barry Friedman Gallery, New York, NY

== Published writing by Michelle Holzapfel ==
2011 -“The Makers’ Game,” an essay in Turning to Art in Wood: A Creative Journey, 25th anniversary exhibition limited-edition Portfolio.

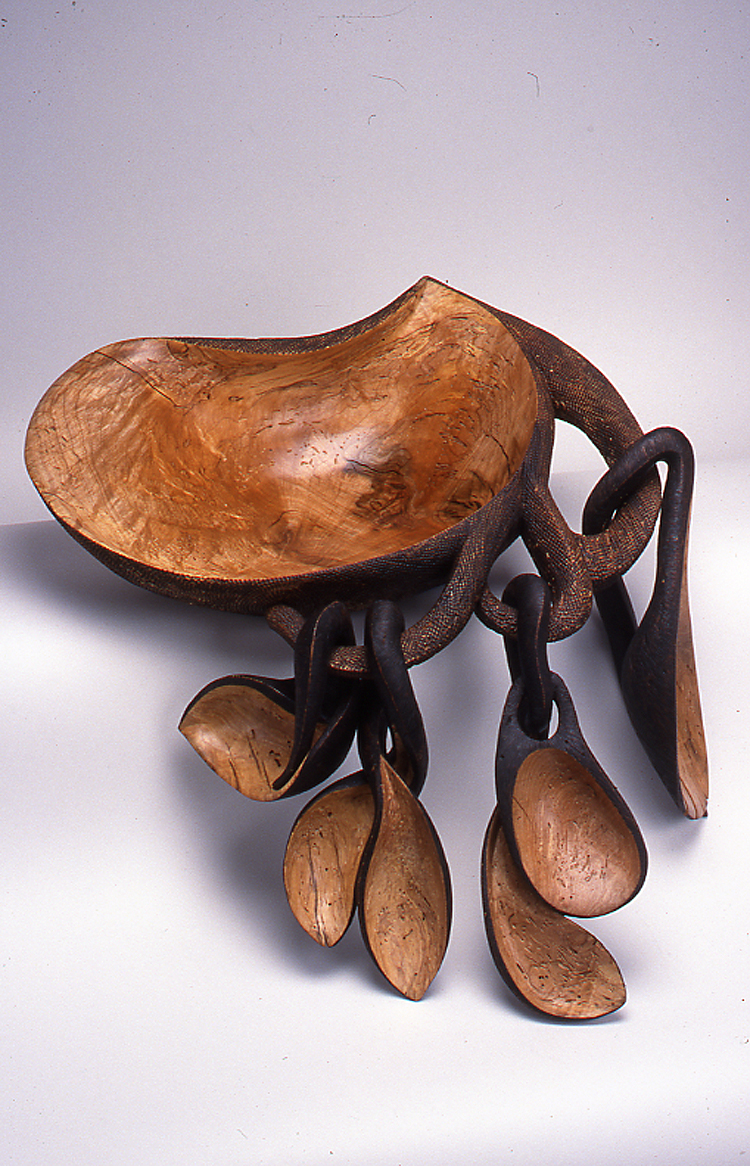

2003 -Cabinets of Curiosity, “Final Thoughts at the Beginning,” M. Holzapfel. Catalogue essay.

2000- -Turning Points, book review: “The Art of the Lathe.” Summer 2000.

1998 -Turning Points, photo essay: “The Woman in Woodturning,” Spring.

1997 -Turning Points, “Reflections of a Perpetual Student”, Spring. ”The Body as Vessel”. Fall. "An Exploration of the Vessel Form", Fall.

1995 -American Woodturner, "Getting a Feeling for Form", December.

1994 -Turning Points, "A Tribute: James Prestini", Summer/Fall.

== Museum collections ==
Wood Turning Center- Philadelphia, PA: Beet 1985, Fishes Vase 1986

Museum of Fine Arts- Boston, MA : Oak Leaves Bowl 1988

R. I. School of Design- Providence, R.I.: Cherry Leaves Bowl 1987

Yale Univ. Art Gallery- New Haven, CT: Domestic Violence #2 1987, Blossfeldt Vase (from Waterburys Collection)

Mint Museum- Charlotte, NC: Quercus Vase 1998, Aegina Bowl 1993 (and other pieces from Mason Collection)

Museum of Art and Design- New York, NY: Story Book 2001

Renwick Collection- Washington, D.C.: Bound Vase 1987 (Mason Collection), Table Bracelet 1997, Autumn Leaves Vase 1991, Suspended Ring 1996, Wall Necklace (and others from Fleur Bresler Collection)

Carleton College- Northfield, MN: Chrysalis Bowl 1998 (from Waterbury collection)

The Contemporary Museum - Honolulu, HI: Black and White Bowl 2003

Columbia Museum- Columbia, SC: Gordian Knot Vase 2002

Cincinnati Art Museum, Cincinnati, OH (Promised bequest David and Nancy Wolf Collection) Thalassa Vase 2002

Louisville Slugger Museum- Louisville, KY: Sandlot Season 1996

Museum of the South- Mobile, Alabama: Red Maple Burl Floor Vase 1987

Minneapolis Institute of Arts—Minneapolis, MN: Pilgrim Bottle 1989

Racine Art Museum-Breakfast (Masons): Houston, Robin Horn, Georgia O Vase

Currier Museum: Peter’s Knot
