= Katie Hudnall =

American woodworker

- Born: 1979 (age 46–47); Alexandria, Virginia
- Known for: Woodworker, educator
- Website: katiehudnall.com

Katie Hudnall (born 1979, Alexandria, Virginia) is an American artist known for her woodworking. Hudnall teaches at the University of Wisconsin–Madison having previously taught at the Herron School of Art and Design in Indianapolis.

Hudnall studied at Corcoran College of Art & Design, where she received her Bachelor of Fine Arts in sculpture in 2001, and then worked with Palli Davene Davis Holubar before going to Virginia Commonwealth University where she received her Master's in Fine Arts in woodworking and furniture design in 2005. She credits Bill Hammersley and Susan Iverson at VCU with encouraging her to integrate her drawings and her internal world with her woodworking practice.

Hudnall begins her works by making extremely detailed drawings and then develops meticulously crafted "hybrid creations of the functional and the fantastical" which often include unexpected, humorous, or interactive elements. She prefers to use recycled and found materials whenever possible and traditional construction methods such as joinery with screws and dowels.

In 2007–2008, Hudnall was the recipient of a Virginia Museum of Fine Arts Professional Fellowship. In 2009, she held the first Windgate Wood Residency at the University of Madison, Wisconsin. In 2010 she held an Anderson Ranch Residency and in 2013 a Peter S. Reed Foundation Fellowship. She returned to the Windgate Wood Residency program in 2016 as an artist, and in 2022 as its Visual Documentarian.

In 2015 Hudnall created the piece Nautilus, a scaled-down library, which was installed at the Eskenazi Health building in Indianapolis, Indiana as part of the Public Collection project there. The installation remained through 2019. Her work is in the collection of The Center for Art in Wood. Her piece, Nut Case, was acquired by the Smithsonian American Art Museum as part of the Renwick Gallery's 50th Anniversary Campaign.
