= Havetoftloit =

- Ortsteil of Mittelangeln
- Coat of arms
- Interactive map of Havetoftloit
- Location within Germany Location within Schleswig-Holstein
- Coordinates: 54°40′N 9°34′E
- Country: Germany
- State: Schleswig-Holstein
- District: Schleswig-Flensburg
- Municipality: Mittelangeln

Area
  - Total: 14.89 km^{2} (5.75 sq mi)
- Elevation: 43 m (141 ft)

Population (2011-12-31)
  - Total: 943
  - Density: 63.3/km^{2} (164/sq mi)
- Time zone: UTC+01:00 (CET)
  - Summer (DST): UTC+02:00 (CEST)
- Postal codes: 24875
- Dialling codes: 04603
- Vehicle registration: SL
- Website: www.amt- mittelangeln.de

Havetoftloit (German pronunciation: [ˈhaːvətɔftˌlɔʏt]; Danish: Havetoftløjt) is a village and a former municipality in the Schleswig-Flensburg district, near the Baltic Sea in northern Germany. Since 1 March 2013, it is part of the municipality Mittelangeln.
