= Rude (surname) =

Rude is a surname. Notable people with the surname include:

- Anna Elizabeth Rude (1876–1960), American physician, health official
- Dick Rude (born 1964), writer, actor, and film director
- Ellen Sergeant Rude (1838-1916), American writer and poet
- François Rude (1784–1855), French sculptor
- George Rudé (1910–1993), British Marxist historian
- Gilbert T. Rude (1881–1962), American Coast and Geodetic Survey and Navy officer
- Rick Rude (1958–1999), ring name of American wrestler Richard Rood
- Steve Rude (born 1956), American comics artist

== See also ==
- Rude Osolnik (1915–2001), American woodturner
- Big Rude Jake (1963–2022; also known as Mr. Rude), Canadian jazz musician
