= Satrup =

- Ortsteil of Mittelangeln
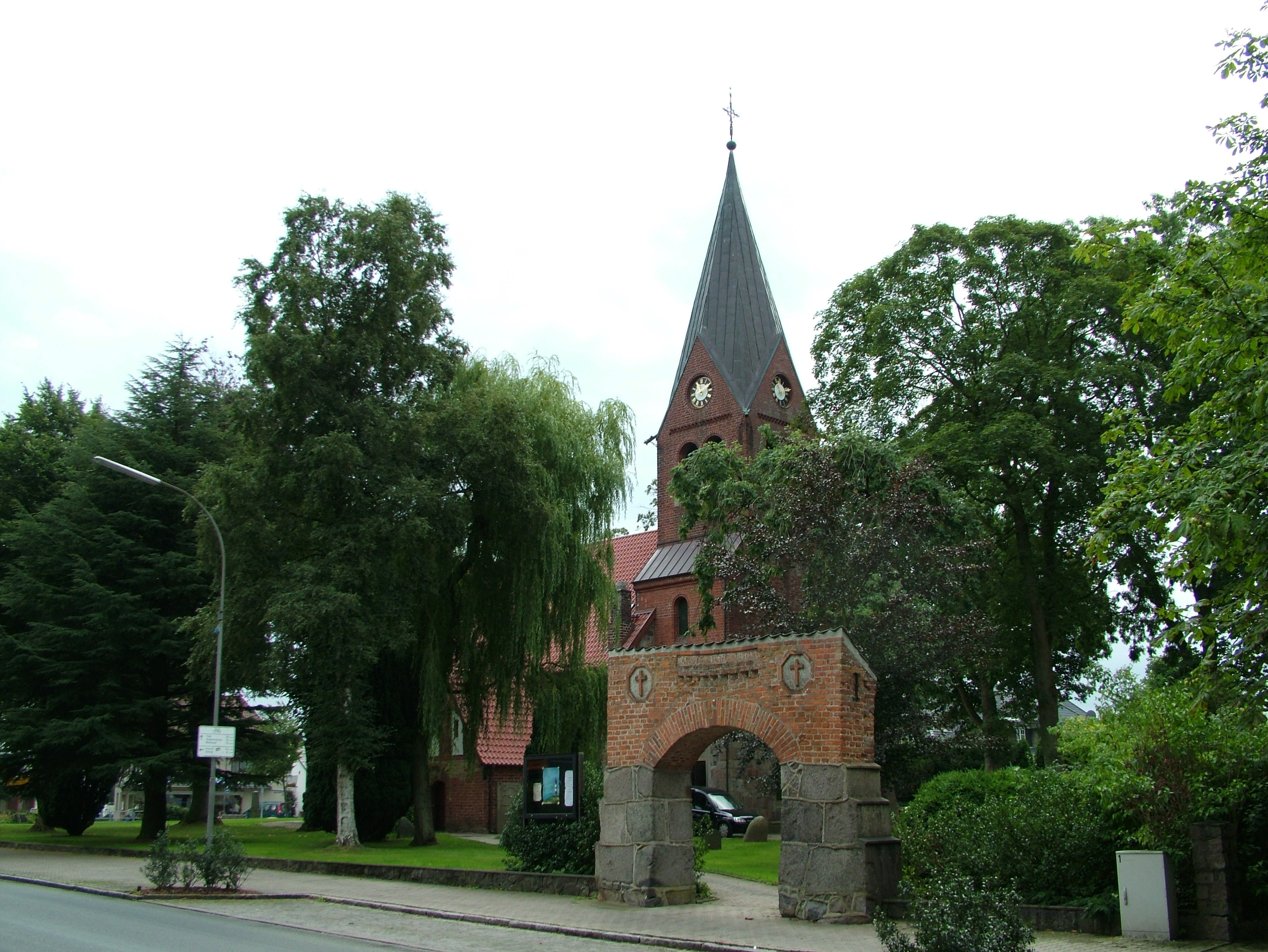
- Church

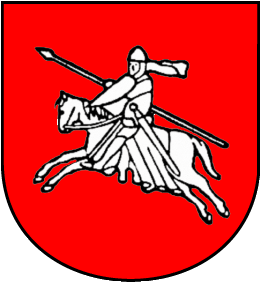
- Coat of arms
- Interactive map of Satrup
- Location within Germany Location within Schleswig-Holstein
- Coordinates: 54°41′38″N 9°36′12″E
- Country: Germany
- State: Schleswig-Holstein
- District: Schleswig-Flensburg
- Municipality: Mittelangeln

Area
  - Total: 23.99 km^{2} (9.26 sq mi)
- Elevation: 38 m (125 ft)

Population (2011-12-31)
  - Total: 3,691
  - Density: 153.9/km^{2} (398.5/sq mi)
- Time zone: UTC+01:00 (CET)
  - Summer (DST): UTC+02:00 (CEST)
- Postal codes: 24984–24986
- Dialling codes: 04633
- Vehicle registration: SL
- Website: amt-mittelangeln.de

Satrup (German pronunciation: [ˈzaːtʁʊp]) is a village and a former municipality in the district of Schleswig-Flensburg, in Schleswig-Holstein, Germany. It is situated approximately 20 km north of Schleswig, and 15 km southeast of Flensburg. Since 1 March 2013, it is part of the municipality Mittelangeln. Satrup is the seat of the Amt ("collective municipality") Mittelangeln. In early May 1945 Heinrich Himmler, former Reichsführer-SS, stayed in a farm near the village for several days while attempting to avoid capture by the Allies.
