= Scarponi =

Scarponi is an Italian surname. Notable people with the surname include:

- Cinzia Savi Scarponi (born 1963), Italian swimmer
- Michele Scarponi (1979–2017), Italian cyclist

== See also ==
- Scarpino, a surname
