= Kay Sekimachi =

American fiber artist and weaver (born 1926)

- Born: September 30, 1926 (age 100); San Francisco, California, U.S.
- Other name: Kay Sekimachi Stockdale
- Education: Pond Farm, Haystack Mountain School of Crafts
- Alma mater: California College of the Arts
- Employer: City College of San Francisco
- Spouse: Bob Stocksdale (m. 1972–2003, death)

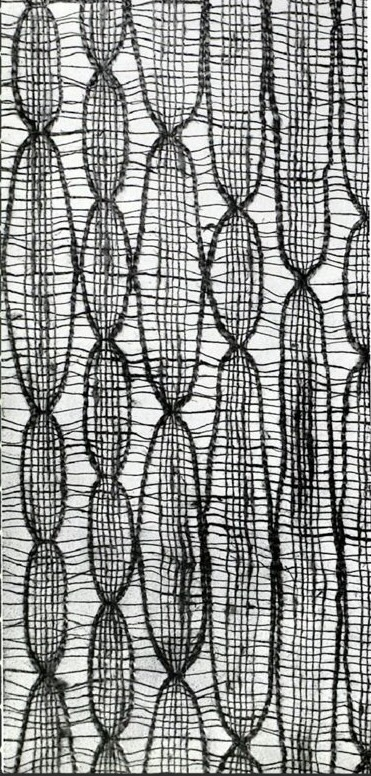
Gauze weaving of natural linen and jute by Kay Sekimachi, ca.1961

Kay Sekimachi (born September 30, 1926) is an American fiber artist and weaver, best known for her three-dimensional woven monofilament hangings as well as her intricate baskets and bowls.

== Early life and education ==
Kay Sekimachi was born in San Francisco on September 30, 1926 to first generation Japanese Americans Takao Sekimachi and Wakuri Sekimachi. After the signing of Executive Order 9066, Sekimachi was interned with her family at Tanforan Assembly Center and then the Topaz War Relocation Center from 1942 to 1944.

From 1946 to 1949 she attended the California College of the Arts (formerly California College of Arts and Crafts), where she initially studied painting, design, and silkscreening. After she visited the weaving room and saw students working on looms, she spent her entire savings on a loom the following day though she did not know anything about weaving. She started her art career weaving clothing and two-dimensional wall pieces. She heard Trude Guermonprez speak at Pond Farm In the summer of 1954 Sekimachi returned to CCAC to study with Guermonprez of whom she said "Trude opened my eyes that weavings don't have to be utilitarian." The student teacher relationship eventually became a deep friendship. Guermonprez challenged Sekimachi, leading her to take on more complex artistic projects. Sekimachi commented in a 1959 article that "Until then I was simply using accepted techniques and relying on books and traditional patterns."

She attended the Haystack Mountain School of Crafts in Liberty, Maine where she studied with Jack Lenor Larsen in 1956. A staunch champion of her work, Larsen also commissioned Sekimachi to design a fabric for his production company.

== Career ==
She started experimenting with nylon monofilament hangings and weaving off loom by 1963. Her complex three-dimensional nylon hangings were featured several of the major exhibitions of the fiber arts movement, including Wall Hangings at the Museum of Modern Art (1969), Deliberate Entanglements at UCLA (1971) and the Biennale internationale de la tapisserie, Lausanne Switzerland in 1975 and 1983.

Sekimachi was part of the New Basketry movement of the late 1960s and early 1970s. Her later works comprised small woven baskets. She also created woven paperfold-like boxes with a Japanese influence. She later created baskets of linen warp ends and rice paper. Most recently, Sekimachi has incorporated objects found while beachcombing into her works, also creating jewelry.

Sekimachi taught in the Textile Arts Department at, her alma mater, California College of Arts and Crafts, starting in the fall of 1975. She also taught at the Adult Division of the City College of San Francisco (formerly San Francisco Community College) and at Lake Almanor, and the Town and Country Weavers.

== Personal life ==
Sekimachi lives in Berkeley, California. In 1972, Sekimachi was married to woodturner Bob Stocksdale.

On September 30, 2026, Sekimachi turned 100.

== Artworks ==
=== Skeletal Leaf Bowl Sculptures ===
In 2015, Kay Sekimachi, along with her husband Bob Stocksdale showcased many of their artworks at the Bellevue Arts Museum in an exhibition called In The Realm of Nature. In this exhibition, Sekimachi shared one of her recent artworks at the time, skeletal leaf bowl sculptures. Before Sekimachi incorporated skeleton leaves into her sculptures, she began making paper bowls to expand her sculpting technique without using a loom. In the process of making paper bowls, Sekimachi would use Stocksdale’s bowls to shape her paper sculptures and wrap them in threads. Afterwards, she began doing workshops on paper bowls and shared in a 2001 interview for Archives of American Art, Smithsonian Institution that she would incorporate various materials in her paper bowls such as leaves and beakers. Eventually, Brooker Morey saw Sekimachi’s leaf bowls at the Palo Alto Cultural Center, shared how he made skeleton leaves, and offered her a set of leaves to incorporate in her leaf bowl sculptures.

== Public collections ==
Sekimachi's artworks are in many museum collections. Her work, Leaf Vessel, was acquired by the Smithsonian American Art Museum as part of the Renwick Gallery's 50th Anniversary Campaign. Her collaborative piece, with Bob Stocksdale, Marriage in Form was also acquired by the Smithsonian. Other museums which hold her work include:

- Metropolitan Museum of Art
- Fine Arts Museums of San Francisco (FAMSF)
- Smithsonian Institution
- Musée des Arts Décoratifs, Paris
- Honolulu Museum of Art Spalding House (formerly The Contemporary Museum, Honolulu)
- Los Angeles County Museum of Art
- Oakland Museum of California
- Museum of Fine Arts, Houston
- Arizona State University Art Museum

== Exhibitions ==
Sekimachi's work has been included in numerous exhibitions. Selected solo and small group exhibitions include:

- Parallel Views: Kay Sekimachi and Nancy Selvin (1982), California Crafts Museum at the Palo Alto Cultural Center, Palo Alto, California
- Marriage in Form: Kay Sekimachi & Bob Stocksdale (1993), Palo Alto Cultural Center, Palo Alto, California. The show subsequently toured to many venues across the United States.
- Kay Sekimachi: An Intimate Eye (2001), Mingei International Museum, San Diego, California
- Loom & Lathe: The Art of Kay Sekimachi and Bob Stocksdale (2008), Berkeley Art Center, Berkeley, California. The exhibition subsequently toured.
- Puako: Jewelry by Kay Sekimachi and Kiff Slemmons (2009), Velvet da Vinci Gallery, San Francisco
- In the Realm of Nature: Bob Stocksdale and Kay Sekimachi (2014), Mingei International Museum, San Diego
- Kay Sekimachi: Student, Teacher, Artist (2016), Textile Education Gallery, De Young Museum, San Francisco
- Bob Stocksdale & Kay Sekimachi: From the Collection of Forrest L. Merrill (2016), Fresno Art Museum, Fresno, California
- Kay Sekimachi Simple Complexity: Works from the Forrest L. Merrill Collection (2016-2017) at the Craft and Folk Art Museum, Los Angeles
- Kay Sekimachi Master Weaver: Innovations in Forms and Materials (2018-2019) at the Fresno Art Museum, Fresno, California
- Woven Histories: Textiles and Modern Abstraction (2024), National Gallery of Art, Washington, DC
- Making Their Mark: Works from the Shah Garg Collection (2024) Berkeley Art Museum and Pacific Film Archive (BAMPFA).

== Awards and honors ==
- American Craft Council (ACC), Fellow, 1985
- Craftsmen's Fellowship Grant, National Endowment for the Arts, 1974
- Women’s Caucus for Art, Honor Award, 1997
- American Craft Council, Gold Medal for Consummate Craftsmanship, 2002
- Master of Medium Award, James Renwick Alliance, Washington, DC, 2007
- Luminaries Award, Fuller Craft Museum, Brockton, Massachusetts, 2011
