= Schnarup-Thumby =

Schnarup-Thumby Snarup-Tumby
- Municipality
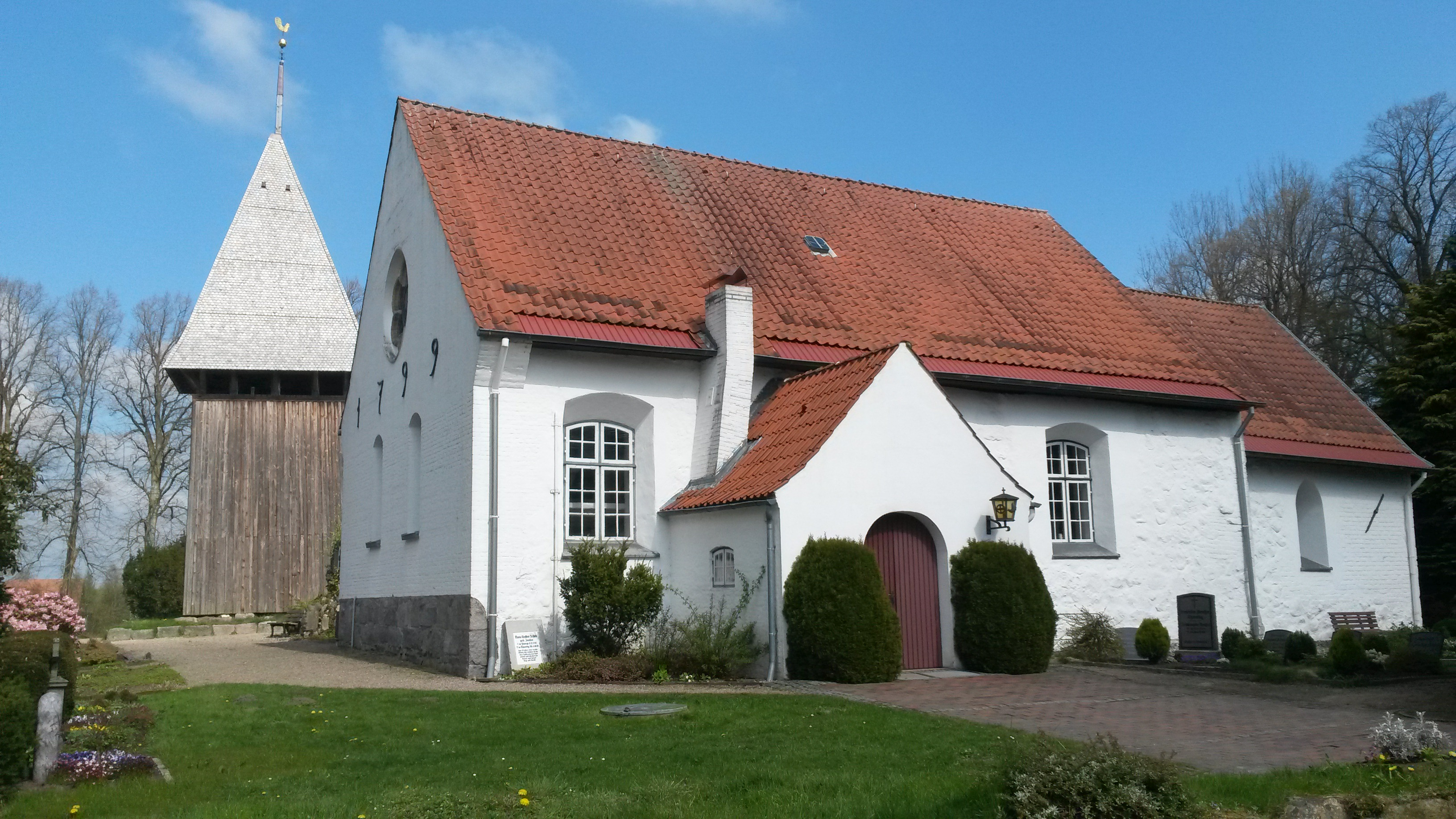
- Schnarup-Thumby Church

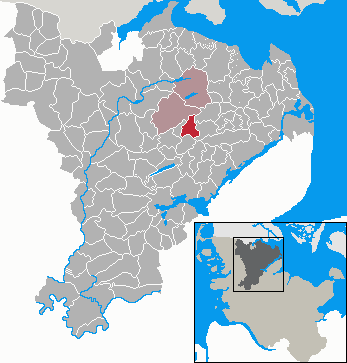
- Location of Schnarup-Thumby; Snarup-Tumby within Schleswig-Flensburg district
- Interactive map of Schnarup-Thumby; Snarup-Tumby
- Location within Germany Location within Schleswig-Holstein
- Coordinates: 54°38′49″N 9°39′25″E
- Country: Germany
- State: Schleswig-Holstein
- District: Schleswig-Flensburg
- Municipal assoc.: Mittelangeln

Government
  - Mayor: Martin Thomsen

Area
  - Total: 10.72 km^{2} (4.14 sq mi)
- Elevation: 31 m (102 ft)

Population (2025-12-31)
  - Total: 524
  - Density: 48.9/km^{2} (127/sq mi)
- Time zone: UTC+01:00 (CET)
  - Summer (DST): UTC+02:00 (CEST)
- Postal codes: 24891
- Dialling codes: 04623
- Vehicle registration: SL
- Website: amt-satrup.de

Schnarup-Thumby (Danish: Snarup-Tumby) is a municipality in the district of Schleswig-Flensburg, in Schleswig-Holstein, Germany.
