= Mittelangeln (Amt) =

Municipality in Schleswig-Holstein, Germany

- Amt
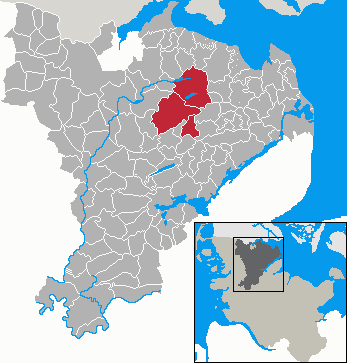
- Map of Schleswig-Flensburg highlighting Mittelangeln
- Interactive map of Mittelangeln
- Location within Germany Location within Schleswig-Holstein
- Coordinates: 54°42′N 9°35′E
- Country: Germany
- State: Schleswig-Holstein
- District: Schleswig-Flensburg
- Seat: Mittelangeln-Satrup
- Subdivisions: 3 municipalities

Area
  - Total: 100.01 km^{2} (38.61 sq mi)

Population (2025-12-31)
  - Total: 9,892
  - Density: 98.91/km^{2} (256.2/sq mi)
- Time zone: UTC+01:00 (CET)
  - Summer (DST): UTC+02:00 (CEST)
- Vehicle registration: SL
- Website: www.amt-mittelangeln.de

Mittelangeln is an Amt ("collective municipality") in the district of Schleswig-Flensburg, in Schleswig-Holstein, Germany. The seat of the Amt is in Satrup, part of the municipality Mittelangeln. Before 1 January 2008, when the municipality Sörup joined, the Amt was named Satrup.

The Amt Mittelangeln consists of the following municipalities:

1. Mittelangeln
2. Schnarup-Thumby
3. Sörup
