= Mittelangeln =

Mittelangeln Midtangel
- Municipality
- Coat of arms

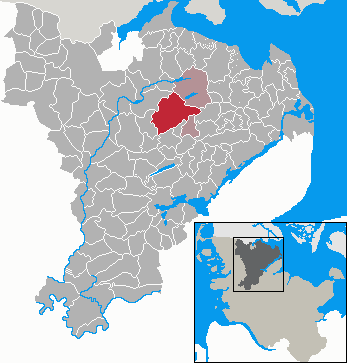
- Location of Mittelangeln; Midtangel within Schleswig-Flensburg district
- Interactive map of Mittelangeln; Midtangel
- Location within Germany Location within Schleswig-Holstein
- Coordinates: 54°41′N 9°36′E
- Country: Germany
- State: Schleswig-Holstein
- District: Schleswig-Flensburg
- Municipal assoc.: Mittelangeln

Area
  - Total: 44.96 km^{2} (17.36 sq mi)
- Elevation: 38 m (125 ft)

Population (2025-12-31)
  - Total: 5,276
  - Density: 117.3/km^{2} (303.9/sq mi)
- Time zone: UTC+01:00 (CET)
  - Summer (DST): UTC+02:00 (CEST)
- Postal codes: 24984–24986
- Dialling codes: 04633
- Vehicle registration: SL
- Website: amt-mittelangeln.de

Mittelangeln (German pronunciation: [ˈmɪtl̩ˌʔaŋln̩], lit. 'Middle Angeln'; Danish: Midtangel) is a municipality in the district of Schleswig-Flensburg, in Schleswig-Holstein, Germany. It was formed on 1 March 2013 by the merger of the former municipalities Satrup, Rüde and Havetoftloit.
