= NextFab =

NextFab Studio
- Company type: Limited liability company
- Founded: 2009
- Founder: Evan D. Malone
- Headquarters: Philadelphia, PA, United States
- Number of locations: 3
- Area served: Pennsylvania New Jersey Delaware
- Number of employees: 50
- Website: https://nextfab.com/

NextFab Studio, LLC (DBA NextFab) is a network of membership-based makerspaces with locations in Philadelphia and Wilmington. Founded in 2009 by Evan Malone, the for-profit company opened its first location in West Philadelphia’s University City Science Center.

NextFab offers users education on and access to manufacturing and prototyping equipment, and is associated with the maker culture and DIY culture.

After TechShop declared bankruptcy and closed all ten domestic locations in 2017, NextFab became the largest network of for-profit makerspaces with three locations in the United States.

== History ==
=== Inception ===
NextFab was founded as a for-profit limited liability company in 2009 by Evan D. Malone, the son of American businessman and philanthropist John C. Malone. Evan Malone received his undergraduate degree in physics from the University of Pennsylvania at the age of 29, and his Ph.D. in mechanical engineering from Cornell University. While at Cornell, he co-founded Fab@Home, the first multi-material 3D printer that's credited with sparking the consumer 3D Printing revolution. During his time at Cornell, Malone took the Fab@Home 3D printer to Johannesburg, South Africa as part of MIT’s Fab Lab, an outreach effort that introduced off-the-shelf digital fabrication tools and design software to communities around the world.

"It was inspirational to see how people with absolutely no technical background were able to invent and produce things that could lift them from poverty. Plus, it got tons of publicity. I felt like I could have an impact." - Evan Malone

NextFab's first location, a 4,400-square-foot space located at 3711 Market Street, opened to the public as a part of the University City Science Center's business incubator in 2010. The project was funded by Malone's family trust and cost $400,000.

=== Expansion ===
After four years in University City, NextFab relocated to a 21,000-square-foot facility on Washington Avenue in South Philadelphia in 2013. The expansion project was supported by a $5 million investment from Malone's family trust.

In December 2014, NextFab opened a 4,000-square-foot second location at 1227 N. 4th Street in the city's South Kensington neighborhood.

NextFab's newest location opened in June 2017 in the creative district of Wilmington, Delaware. Aided by the Wilmington Renaissance Corporation (WRC) and a $350,000 grant from the Delaware Economic Development Office (DEDO), the expansion was officially announced in late 2015 and was estimated to take a year and a half to complete. The project was delayed slightly after the first prospective building lease fell through. On June 14, 2017 NextFab hosted a ribbon cutting ceremony to celebrate its opening at 503 N. Tatnall Street.

In July 2018, NextFab announced its plans to close the location at 1227 N. 4th Street and relocate half a mile north to a large warehouse at 1800 N. American Street. Within the 60,000-square-foot building, NextFab planned to occupy around 21,000-square-feet and share the rest with multiple sub-tenants including a local reuse non-profit, The Resource Exchange. The expanded location was scheduled to open by the end of 2019.

== Services ==
=== Education Services ===
NextFab provides training in the following areas:

- 2D printing and photography
- 3D printing and scanning
- Design software
- Electronics
- Jewelry
- Laser cutting and engraving
- Metalworking
- Textiles
- Woodworking

=== Business Services ===
==== Hardware Accelerator ====
NextFab's accelerator program, branded as RAPID (Revenue through Advanced manufacturing, Product development, Innovation and Design thinking), provides funding and business resources for startups focused on developing a physical hardware product or device. Started in 2017, the 12-week accelerator accepts two cohorts of around four teams each per year.

==== Notable Companies ====
Some startup companies that have benefited from NextFab's facilities and services include Augean Robotics (AGR), Biomeme, Strados Labs, Tozuda and Unruly Studios.
