= Bert Marsh =

British artist (1932–2011)

- Born: Bert Marsh; 1932; Brighton, England
- Died: 22 May 2011 (aged 78–79)
- Occupation: Woodturner

Bert Marsh (1932 — 22 May 2011) was a British woodturner, known for his beautiful forms and technical mastery. He was raised in Hove, England. "Bert was known throughout the woodturning world as a talented turner, inveterate story-teller, and mentor for many of today’s top turners." He has been called "the king of British woodturning."

== Life ==
Marsh started his apprenticeship in 1945 at a local furniture factory, where he was introduced to lathe work, drawn by his passion for wood. After completing his apprenticeship, he was drafted into the Royal Air Force (RAF), where he was a mechanic for Spitfire, Hornet, and Mosquito airplane engines in Selar, British Malaya (now Malaysia).

After the end of World War II and demobilisation in 1953, he educated himself extensively in his craft.

- Brighton College of Arts, four-year course in cabinetry
- Two year course in Timber Technology
- Licentiateship of the City and Guilds of London Institute in Furniture Making (two-year course)
- Machine woodworking, two-year course.

In 1965 he started teaching full time at the Brighton College of Arts. After 15 years lecturing and teaching, he suffered a severe heart attack and chose to retire from teaching and dedicate himself to woodturning.

"From an early age, I felt a profound need to work with wood. I love the material passionately. There is no complex philosophy attached to the work I do. I am simply striving to achieve the perfect form, the purest possible curves expressed in simple, uncluttered shapes that will expose the beauty of the wood to the full."

== Works ==
His work is in the Smithsonian Museum and the Minneapolis Institute of Art.

Marsh received an Honorary Life Membership in the Association of Woodturners of Great Britain (AWGB) in 2009 for services to woodturning.

Bert Marsh was the author of two books:

- Woodturning, A Foundation Course, Keith Rowley, Bert Marsh, Ray Key
- Bert Marsh, Woodturner, 160 pp, Sterling Pub Co

His exhibitions include

- National Woodturning Show, Birmingham, UK 1993 (An international show, despite its name.)
- Woodturning, Nottingham, UK 1990

His work has been on auction multiple times, receiving prices up to several thousand pounds."THE BERT MARSH PLAIN TURNING COMPETITION FOR COMPANY LIVERYMEN AND FREEMEN" woodturning competition is held annually in his honour.
