= Rüde =

- Ortsteil of Mittelangeln
- Interactive map of Rüde
- Location within Germany Location within Schleswig-Holstein
- Coordinates: 54°49′N 9°35′E
- Country: Germany
- State: Schleswig-Holstein
- District: Schleswig-Flensburg
- Municipality: Mittelangeln

Area
  - Total: 6.1 km^{2} (2.4 sq mi)
- Elevation: 37 m (121 ft)

Population (2011-12-31)
  - Total: 366
  - Density: 60/km^{2} (160/sq mi)
- Time zone: UTC+01:00 (CET)
  - Summer (DST): UTC+02:00 (CEST)
- Postal codes: 24986
- Dialling codes: 04633
- Vehicle registration: SL
- Website: www.amt- mittelangeln.de

Rüde (German pronunciation: [ˈʁyːdə]; Danish: Ryde) is a village and a former municipality in the district of Schleswig-Flensburg, in Schleswig-Holstein, Germany. Since 1 March 2013, it is part of the municipality Mittelangeln.
