= James Prestini =

American sculptor, designer and woodworker

- Born: January 13, 1908; Waterford, Connecticut
- Died: July 26, 1993 (aged 85); Berkeley, California
- Education: Yale University
- Occupations: Sculptor, woodworker
- Awards: Guggenheim Fellowship for Creative Arts, US & Canada (1972)

James Libero Prestini (January 13, 1908 – July 26, 1993) was an American sculptor, designer and woodworker.

== Early life and education ==
He was born on January 13, 1908, in Waterford, Connecticut. He graduated as a mechanical engineer from Yale University in 1930. In 1933 he began teaching mathematics at Lake Forest Academy.

== Career ==
James held the post of professor of design at the University of California, Berkeley from 1956 to 1975. He was known for his art of crafting wood into thin bowls and platters, having qualities similar to that of glass or ceramics. He made over 400 sculptures throughout his career. His work is held in the collections of the Smithsonian American Art Museum, the Museum of Modern Art and the Art Institute of Chicago.

== Death ==
He died of heart failure on July 26, 1993.
