= Bob Stocksdale =

American woodturner (1913–2003)

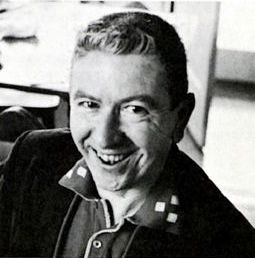
- Born: Robert Stocksdale; 1913; Warren, Indiana, U.S.
- Died: January 6, 2003; Oakland, California, U.S.
- Occupation: Woodturner
- Spouse: Kay Sekimachi (m. 1972–2003, death)

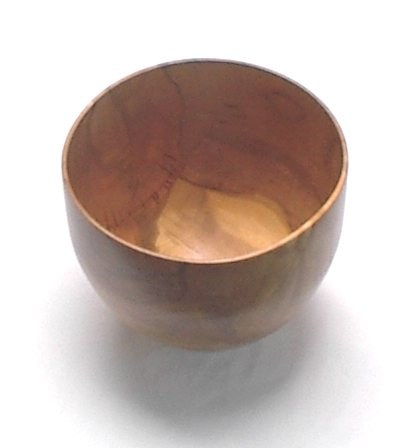
Stocksdale bowl

Bob Stocksdale (1913 – January 6, 2003) was an American woodturner, known for his bowls formed from rare and exotic woods. He was raised on his family farm and enjoyed working with tools. His wife of more than 30 years, Kay Sekimachi, stated that, "His grandfather gave him a pocketknife, and he started to whittle. That's how it started."

== Life ==
According to an oral history he recorded at the University of California Bancroft Library, Stocksdale powered his first lathe with a surplus Maytag gasoline washing machine motor. He turned baseball bats and spindles among early projects. After graduating from high school, he worked in a factory making wooden paddles used by cracker bakers. Later he worked in a factory that made cedar chests. His job was to assemble the chests from the pre-cut wooden pieces.

He was drafted into the Army in 1942. Like two of his three brothers, he claimed conscientious objector (CO) status during World War II because he believed war never solved anything. He spent World War II in several CO camps doing forestry work. It was at a camp in Michigan where Stocksdale turned his first bowl on a lathe. This brought him to the West. He was encouraged in his woodturning efforts by Helen Winnemore, the owner of a crafts gallery in Columbus, Ohio.

After the war, Stocksdale moved to Berkeley, California in 1946, one year after Gump's in San Francisco began showing his work. Stocksdale was one of the earliest members of the Arts and Crafts Cooperative, Inc. (ACCI) on Shattuck Avenue in Berkeley, California. His first solo exhibition followed in 1958 at the Long Beach Museum of Art. He bought a Victorian duplex in South Berkeley, where he lived and worked for the rest of his life. He put together a shop of modest tools in his basement, and there turned out work (an average of 200 turned wood bowls per year, alone, not to mention other objet d'art) for more than 50 years that gradually earned him acclaim and fame as a woodturner. He was a friend, and sometime collaborator, of Sam Maloof.

Stocksdale died on the January 6, 2003, at Kaiser Oakland Medical Center in Oakland, California from complications of prostate cancer. He was 89. He was survived by second wife, Kay Sekimachi, a famous weaver and craft artist; a daughter, Joy, a noted fabric designer, of Sebastopol, California; a son, Kim, of Los Angeles; and a sister-in-law, Marge Stocksdale of Huntington, Indiana.

== Works ==
His work was included in the American exhibit of the 1958 Brussels World’s Fair and has been recognized internationally for fine design and workmanship. His many honors include the American Association of Woodturners Lifetime Achievement Award (1998) and the Masters of the Medium Award, James Renwick Alliance (2003). Stocksdale received the American Craft Council’s Gold Medal in 1995.

Stocksdale's bowls are prized by collectors. They have been shown in Europe and Japan, and they appear in the permanent collections of the Smithsonian American Art Museum, the Metropolitan Museum of Art in New York, the Oakland Museum, Philadelphia Museum of Art and the Royal Scottish Museum in Edinburgh, Scotland.

== See also ==
- List of woodturners
- Rude Osolnik
