= George Lailey =

George Lailey (1869–1958) was a craftsman from the United Kingdom, noted as the last professional practitioner of the traditional craft of bowl-turning using a pole lathe.

== Life ==
Lailey lived in Miles Green, near the Berkshire village of Bucklebury Common, near Newbury. Both his grandfather, George William Lailey (1782–1871) and his father William (1847–1912) were also bowl-turners, specialising in the production of bowls and plates from elm wood using a pole lathe. George Lailey was particularly noted for his exceptional skill of turning bowls in a 'nest', one inside another. After being mentioned in Henry Vollam Morton's popular 1927 book In Search of England, Lailey's work became increasingly desirable, and he began signing and dating his pieces.

George Lailey was unmarried, had no children to pass his skills to, and was unable to find anyone who wanted to continue his business. By the time of his death in December 1958 he had for many years been the last practitioner of his craft, and his equipment and tools were given to the University of Reading's Museum of English Rural Life.

== Working techniques ==
Lailey's workshop, on Bucklebury Common, had the form of a Grubenhaus (a sunken-floored building of early mediaeval type), though it dated from the nineteenth century. He did not install an electricity supply, though one was available.

Lailey made a variety of items (including wooden ladles) but concentrated mainly on bowls, produced in a variety of sizes. For this, elm logs were seasoned for at least two years, sawn with a crosscut saw, and then trimmed using a side axe; the blanks were then roughly turned, stored for a further short period and finished on the lathe, applying a polish of beeswax and turmeric root. Most of the specialist tools used would have been made by Lailey himself.

Lailey charged a relatively modest amount for his services, although he and his father had also supplied leading London stores, including Harrods, with their work around the turn of the twentieth century, when there was a fashion for craftsman-made items. He told Morton that "Money's only storing up trouble, I think. I like making bowls better than I like making money."
