= Briff Lane Meadows =

Protected area in Berkshire, England

- Site of Special Scientific Interest
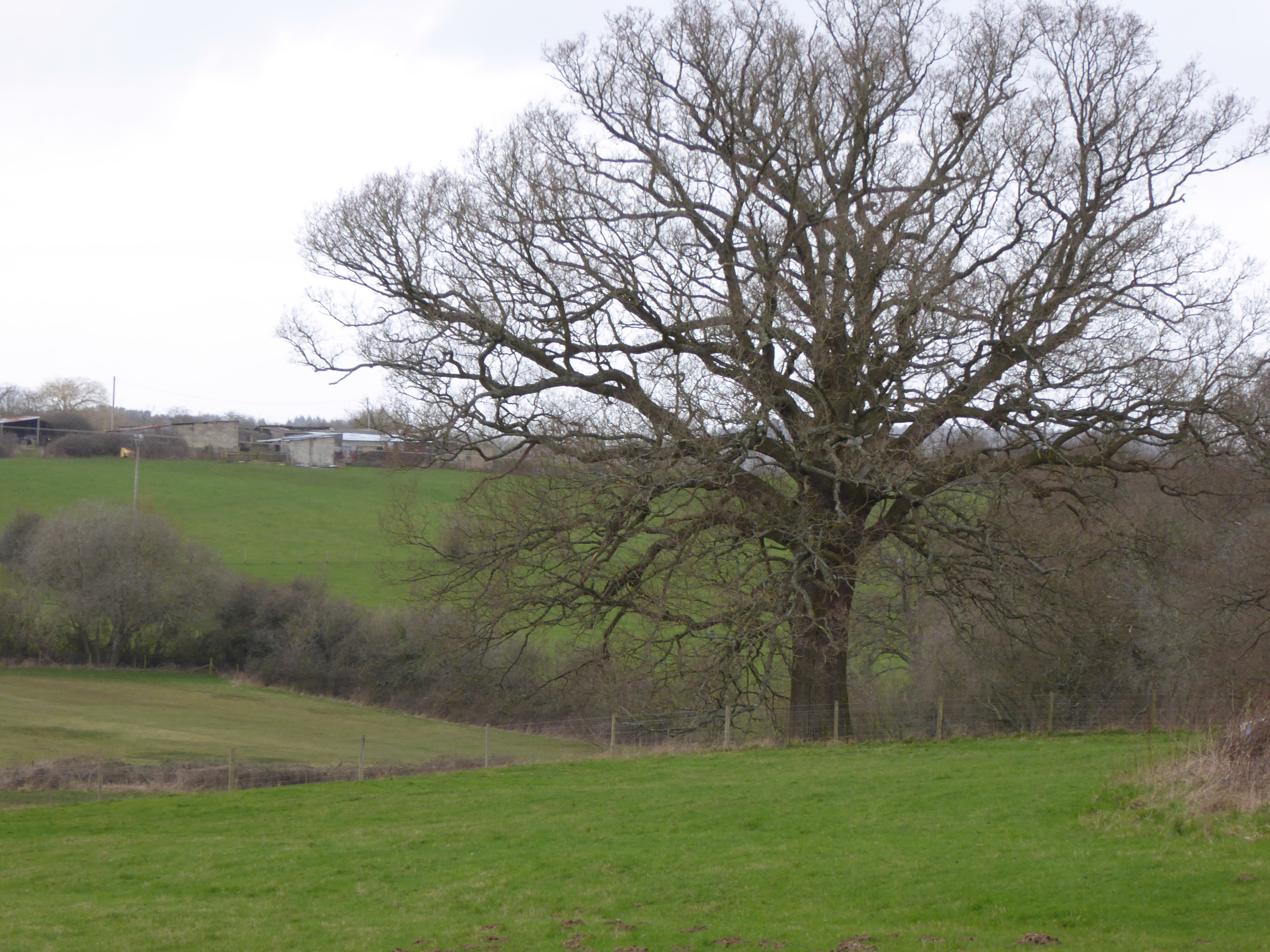

- Location within Berkshire
- Location of Briff Lane Meadows.
- Area of search: Berkshire
- Grid reference: SU 544 702
- Coordinates: 51.428°N 1.220°W
- Interest: Biological
- Area: 8.9 hectares (22 acres)
- Notification date: 1986
- Location map: Magic Map

Briff Lane Meadows is a 8.9-hectare (22-acre) biological Site of Special Scientific Interest north of Thatcham in Berkshire.

These meadows have unimproved traditionally managed grassland, a small stream, blackthorn dominated scrub, belts of woodland along the field edges and hedges. Most of the site is poorly drained and seasonally waterlogged, but there are dry areas which have large populations of cowslip, heath-grass, devil's-bit scabious and dyer's greenweed.

The site is private land with no public access.
