= Mel Lindquist =

American sculptor

- Born: Melvin Benjamin Lindquist; July 5, 1911; Kingsburg, California, U.S.
- Died: November 24, 2000 (aged 89); Quincy, Florida, U.S.
- Education: Oakland Polytechnic College of Engineering
- Known for: Wood turning, engineering
- Movement: American Studio Wood Turning
- Awards: Fellow American Society of Quality Control; New England Living Art Treasure, University of Massachusetts Amherst,1983; The First "National Woodturning Conference Award" for outstanding achievements in Studio Woodturning, Arrowmont School of Arts and Crafts, 1985; Lifetime Member; American Association of Woodturners, 1993

Mel Lindquist (July 5, 1911 – November 24, 2000; born Melvin Benjamin Lindquist) was an American engineer and woodturner. He was a renowned pioneer of the American studio woodturning movement.

== Career ==
Foundational to the studio woodturning movement, Mel Lindquist applied his master machinist techniques and background in engineering, pioneering hollowing techniques called "blind boring", or "blind turning", widely used today.

In addition to his numerous technical innovations, Mel Lindquist is also widely credited for developing an aesthetic foundation for the studio woodturning movement based on translating ancient ceramic ideals into the medium of wood, incorporating bark inclusions and imperfections as decorative elements within the turning integral to design. Mel Lindquist discovered spalted wood on his land in the upstate New York Adirondacks in the 1950s and together with his son Mark Lindquist, popularized its use as a material for woodturning and woodworking. Mel Lindquist is widely credited as being the first to seriously explore the use of spalted wood for wood turning, and his son Mark wrote groundbreaking essays in journals of the 1970s. The effect was widespread according to Fine Woodworking: "...Melvin and Mark Lindquist unleashed spalted wood upon the world...."

In 1981, Mel and his son Mark initiated the wood turning program at the Arrowmont School of Arts and Crafts, TN, and in October 1985, Mel won the first award honoring the pillars of the studio woodturning movement at the national conference: Woodturning: Vision and Concept at Arrowmont School, TN.

Lindquist signed his work with a simple script "L" including the date and type of wood from the early 1950s until 1980. After 1980 he signed his work with an incised script signature "Mel Lindquist" on the bottoms of his pieces.

Mel Lindquist's work can be found in numerous public and private collections in the US and abroad, including the Metropolitan Museum of Art, New York City, the M.H. de Young Memorial Museum, San Francisco, the Smithsonian American Art Museum, Washington D.C., the Houston Museum of Fine Arts, TX, and the White House Collection of American Crafts.
