= Chapel Row =

Village in Berkshire, England

Coordinates: 51.4215°N 1.1796°W

- Hamlet
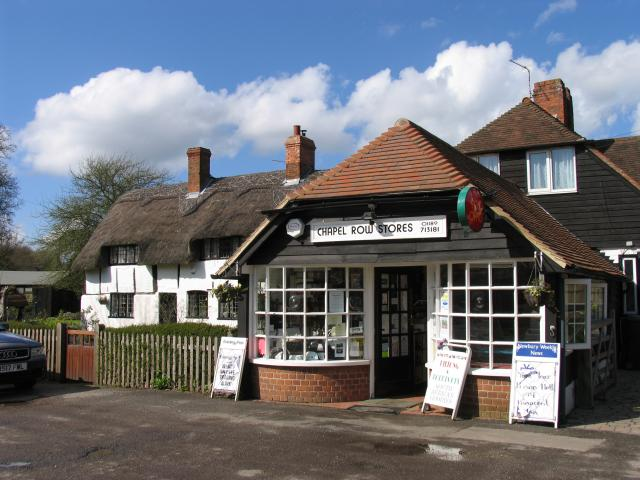
- Former Chapel Row Post Office and Stores

- Location within Berkshire
- Population: 627 (2019 estimate)
  - Density: 0.4125
- OS grid reference: SU572695
- Civil parish: Bucklebury
- Unitary authority: West Berkshire
- Ceremonial county: Berkshire
- Region: South East
- Country: England
- Sovereign state: United Kingdom
- Post town: Newbury
- Postcode district: RG7
- Dialling code: 0118
- Police: Thames Valley
- Fire: Royal Berkshire
- Ambulance: South Central
- UK Parliament: Reading West and Mid Berkshire

Chapel Row is a hamlet in West Berkshire, England, and part of the civil parish of Bucklebury. In 2019 it had an estimated population of 627.

== History ==
The hamlet was first documented in 1617 as Chapel Rewe and subsequently featured on Roque's Map of Berkshire in 1761.

There was a chapel in the area built sometime before the 12th century, which led to the naming of the hamlet. The chapel was in decay by the 12th century, but extant as ruins in the 18th century. It no longer exists.

Since the mid 17th century, an inn has stood near to the locality's green. The site is now occupied by The Bladebone Inn.

=== Chapel Row Revels ===
In the 18th century, Chapel Row became known for its revels, which were held on the Monday following the feast of Saint Anne. The revels featured events such as backswording (described by Joseph Addison in The Spectator as "a ring of cudgel players who broke one another's heads in order to make some impression on their mistresses' hearts"). The sport was not featured in a number of later fayres as at least one contender was reported to have been killed. An 1812 Reading Mercury article on the fayre focusses primarily on agriculture, stating that the event was an opportunity to trade cattle and employ farmhands.

== Geography ==
The settlement is on a minor crossroads, on the C road topping the northern escarpment between Thatcham and Theale above the Kennet valley and is centred 5.5 miles (8.9 km) east north-east of Newbury. Woodland, with public access as common land and under the Countryside and Rights of Way Act 2000, occupies the land immediatedly west and south-west of the clustered centre, Bucklebury Common.

== Notable people ==
Chapel Row was the home of the Princess of Wales before her marriage in April 2011.
