= Moulthrop family =

American woodturning family

The Moulthrop family are three generations of American woodturners, starting with Ed Moulthrop, credited as the "father of modern woodturning". The family has been documented in the book Moulthrop: A Legacy in Wood.

== Ed Moulthrop ==
Ed Moulthrop (May 22, 1916 – September 24, 2003) was a noted architect and professor, born in Rochester, New York. He is best known as a woodturning artist whose art helped transform the genre into a widely respected art form. He was also an accomplished architect whose designs were used for several key structures around Atlanta, Georgia.

=== Education and architectural career ===
Ed Moulthrop attended Western Reserve University (now Case Western Reserve University) and later received a scholarship allowing him to attend Princeton University where he earned a degree in architecture. He traveled abroad during his education, studying architecture in Paris, London and Switzerland as well as watercolor painting in Fontainebleau.

After graduating from Princeton University, Moulthrop moved to Atlanta, Georgia, where he taught architecture at the Georgia Institute of Technology for five years. During World War II, when the military needed physics teachers, he taught physics as well. While teaching at Georgia Tech, he found a love of working with wood in the school's industrial arts shop, where he had access to a variety of woodworking tools.

Moulthrop eventually left Georgia Tech to pursue a career in architecture, later becoming the chief designer for Robert and Company. Although the company was largely concerned with engineering, he provided the non-engineering concepts that they needed. Moulthrop's work with Robert and Company would prove to be an outlet for many of his modernist designs. Some of these modernist designs even drew compliments from world-famous architects, such as Frank Lloyd Wright, who once pointed to one of Moulthrop's buildings and said "I like that one".

Many of Moulthrop's architectural designs can still be seen today throughout the U.S. including portions of the Library of Congress in Washington D.C., the Van Leer Electrical Engineering building at Georgia Tech, the Atlanta Civic Center, the Carillon Tower at Stone Mountain, and the Callaway Memorial Chapel at Callaway Gardens.

=== Arts and career as an artist ===
During the late 1930s and early 1940s, Moulthrop studied the general arts, including drawing and watercolor painting. He developed an early love for working with wood, which would eventually lead to his most notable successes as an artist. He bought his first lathe when he was sixteen and over the years was able to get his hands on larger ones to turn larger pieces. As he began to refine his turned vessels he attracted a sizable audience, an audience that included well-known people in the art community and even a United States President.

Moulthrop's vessels are admired for a number of reasons. Their scale is larger than most other pieces. It was not uncommon to see him turning a large, 5-foot-tall (1.5 m) piece on the lathe in his home workshop. Because of these large-scale projects, Moulthrop invented many of his own tools, the same tools that would later be featured in several wood arts magazines. Another innovation of his was his use of polyethylene glycol (PEG) to help prevent cracking in his more advanced pieces. His turned wood pieces would be coated with a clear finish that would be as smooth as glass. This latter characteristic helped some of his vessels find their way into collections of well-known glass collectors.

Over the years, Moulthrop developed relationships with several gallery owners, others in the woodworking fields and several well-known clients. This helped to spread knowledge of his work and pieces across the country. His work was showcased in several art galleries, which at the time was a first for woodturning artists, whose art was often viewed as more of a craft than a well-respected art form.

One day, he received a call from fellow woodworker President Jimmy Carter. President Carter had read about what Moulthrop was doing and was eager to visit Moulthrop's home workshop. This led to a lifelong friendship and a relationship that would place his pieces in the hands of political dignitaries worldwide.

Today, Moulthrop is recognized as the father of modern woodturning, and credited with moving woodturning from a simple craft to an art form. His vessels have become prized pieces of private collections as well as fixtures in galleries, museums such as the Museum of Modern Art and the Metropolitan Museum of Art in New York, Chicago Art Institute, Renwick Gallery, New Britain Museum of American Art, Smithsonian Institution and the Boston Museum of Fine Arts. One of his pieces was even shown in the White House Collection of American Crafts.

== Philip Moulthrop ==
Philip Moulthrop (born November 12, 1947, in Atlanta, Georgia) is the son of Ed Moulthrop.

=== Education and military ===
Philip graduated with a BA from West Georgia College in 1969. When he left college he had to consider the looming military draft. He enlisted with the United States Navy as part of a two-year active duty program. He was transferred back to Atlanta for a year, where he attended weekly meetings, until he was called up for active duty.

Philip Moulthrop's active duty took him straight to Vietnam where he was assigned to work as a language instructor in Saigon. During his year-long stay in Vietnam he took up photography to help pass the time. His time spent in the Navy allowed him to see many things and places that he never would have been able to see otherwise.

After serving in the Navy, Philip went back to college at Woodrow Wilson College of Law where he graduated in 1978 with his degree in law.

=== Career ===
Philip originally started his professional life working as a lawyer. Over several years he started to work more and more with wood, much as his father had, and eventually left the law field to work as a full-time woodturner. His career was helped by a number of influential people, one of whom was the collector Bud Jacobson.

Bud Jacobson acquired several of Philip's pieces for his own collection, which was later featured at the Renwick Gallery of the Smithsonian Institution. Connections like these led to his work being known by many well-known people and featured in very prominent collections.

In 1992 Philip introduced a new style of wood vessel, his mosaic series. These vessels were formed by taking cross sections of various branches and blending them with a dark black resin. The vessel would then be sanded down and polished, producing a unique result. These works are considered by many collectors to be his most prominent contribution to the woodturning field.

In 1993 President Bill Clinton and First Lady Hillary Clinton encouraged the creation of the first official White House crafts collection, which would serve as a tribute to the ongoing tradition of American crafts. Michael Monroe, curator-in-charge of the Renwick Gallery of the Smithsonian Institution's National Museum of American Art, was chosen to be the curator of this new collection. Monroe, who was already familiar with the work of the Moulthrop family, chose Ed and Philip Moulthrop to be included in the collection.

In June 2004 Philip's work was chosen to be used as gifts for each of the eight national leaders attending the G8 summit in Sea Island, Georgia. He provided eight bowls, which would travel home to eight nations, helping to give him worldwide recognition as a prominent woodturner.

Philip's pieces can be viewed in permanent collections across the world including The Olympic Museum in Lausanne, Switzerland, the Museum of Arts and Design (formerly American Craft Museum) in New York City, The Smithsonian Institution, Renwick Gallery of the National Museum of American Art in Washington, D.C., Yale University Art Gallery in New Haven, CT, and many other prominent galleries and museums.

== Matt Moulthrop ==
Matt Moulthrop (born November 8, 1977, in Atlanta, Georgia) is the son of Philip Moulthrop and the grandson of Ed Moulthrop.

=== Career ===
Following in the footsteps of his father and grandfather, Matt Moulthrop turned his first bowl at the age of 7. Completing his BBA at the University of Georgia and MBA at Georgia Tech, Matt tried his hand at work in the 9-to-5 world, but ultimately eased into turning wood as a career, making him the third generation of Moulthrops to carry on the craft.
