= Ashley Eriksmoen =

Artist and Furniture Maker

- Education: Boston College (BFS 1992), College of the Redwoods (Certificate, 1998), Rhode Island School of Design (MFA 2000)
- Known for: Furniture maker and educator
- Website: https://ashleyeriksmoen.com/home.html

Ashley Eriksmoen is a California-born Australia-based furniture maker, woodworker, artist, and educator.

== Early life and education ==
Eriksmoen was born in raised in southern California. Eriksmoen attended Boston College, receiving a BS in geology in 1992. She took a year off during undergraduate to study art at the Istituto Lorenzo de' Medici in Florence, Italy. Eriksmoen studied at the College of the Redwoods (now the Krenov School) from 1997 to 1998, receiving a Certificate of Fine Woodworking. She went on to receive a master's degree in Fine Arts from the Rhode Island School of Design, graduating in 2000.

== Career ==
=== Artist ===
Eriksmoen uses salvaged urban waste such as tables and chairs to create complex interwoven sculptures. She was included in a curated group exhibition in 2019 about humans and the environment titled I Thought I Heard a Bird at Craft ACT in Canberra, Australia. Her series Feral: Rewilding Furniture, made with found broken timber, personifies and animates found furniture, comparing the living and built world. She was an artist-in-residence artist at San Diego State University and is a member of the Furniture Society and part of the Studio Furniture movement.

Her artwork has been published in 500 Tables, American Woodworker Magazine, and With Wakened Hands, a book on the students of James Krenov. She was awarded a Fuji Xerox Sustainable Art Award in 2014 Eriksmoen's piece Criogriff was featured in the exhibition Making a Seat at the Table: Women Transform Woodworking at the Center for Art in Wood in 2019 curated by Dierdre Visser and Laura Mays. She was also interviewed for the book Joinery, Joists and Gender: A History of Woodworking for the 21st Century, by Visser.

In 2021 Eriksomen won Tasmania's Clarence Prize with her furniture piece "Following years of steady decline we are witnessing a period of unprecedented growth". Her "Meares Island Nurse Log" furniture piece was selected for the 2022 Melbourne Design Fair, presented by the National Gallery of Victoria with the Melbourne Art Foundation. Her chaise, "The Dream or: the view from here is both bleak and resplendent" won the 2022 Australian Furniture Design Award, awarded by Stylecraft and the National Gallery of Victoria.

=== Educator ===
Eriksmoen is the Head of Furniture Workshop, Convenor of Craft and Design and Senior Lecturer in the College of Arts and Social Sciences, Australian National University.
