= Mark Lindquist =

American artist (born 1949)

- Born: 1949 (age 76–77); Oakland, California
- Education: New England College BA, Pratt Institute, Florida State University MFA
- Known for: Sculpture, Photography
- Spouse: Kathleen Bragg Lindquist
- Awards: MacDowell Colony; Fellowship 1980, Fellow, National Endowment for the Arts/Southern Arts Federation 1989, Fellow, American Craft Council 2007; Honorary Lifetime Member, American Association of Woodturners, 2010

Mark Lindquist (born 1949) is an American sculptor in wood, artist, author, and photographer. Lindquist is a major figure in the redirection and resurgence of woodturning in the United States beginning in the early 1970s. His communication of his ideas through teaching, writing, and exhibiting, has resulted in many of his pioneering aesthetics and techniques becoming common practice. In the exhibition catalog for a 1995 retrospective of Lindquist's works at the Renwick Gallery of the Smithsonian American Art Museum, his contributions to woodturning and wood sculpture are described as "so profound and far-reaching that they have reconstituted the field". He has often been credited with being the first turner to synthesize the disparate and diverse influences of the craft field with that of the fine arts world.

== Early achievements ==
Lindquist's work is characterized by an empathy with the natural aesthetics of wood, technical innovation, and art historical connections. Among his notable early achievements was the introduction of the aesthetic of Asian ceramics into American woodturning. Along with his father, wood-turning pioneer Mel Lindquist, he also developed new tools and techniques that expanded the vocabulary of woodturning, and pioneered the use of spalted wood. In the early 1980s, he applied techniques he had developed for large-scale woodturning to create his massive, textured "Totemic Series Sculptures," in the Modernist tradition of Brâncuși.

== Ichiboku series ==
Beginning in 1985, Lindquist created his "Ichiboku series" sculptures: six- to eight-foot-tall (1.8–2.4 m) sculptures from a single block of wood, applying the philosophy and techniques of ninth-century Japanese Buddhist woodcarving to the formal concepts of Modernism. Unlike his earlier works, woodturning was not the primary method for their creation. These sculptures were exhibited in 1990 along with seven other influential sculptors of the decade (including Raoul Hague and Ursula von Rydingsvard). Lindquist's "Ichiboku" sculptures distinguished themselves from others in the exhibition, and from the work of most wood artists of the time, by their identification with the spirit of the tree, a concept he adopted from the Japanese. Rather than imposing an external idea upon the wood, he "was engaged in a dialogue with trees"; This approach was antithetical to the mainstream of 20th-century art, which was intellectually removed from the appreciation of nature.

== Public collections ==
Lindquist's work can be found on permanent display in many American museums and public collections including the Metropolitan Museum of Art, New York City, the M.H. de Young Memorial Museum, San Francisco, the Smithsonian American Art Museum, Washington D.C., Museum of Fine Arts, Boston, Yale University Art Gallery and the Victoria and Albert Museum.

== Honors and awards ==
- 2010 Honorary Lifetime Member, American Association of Woodturners
- 2007 Fellow, American Craft Council
- 1999 Distinguished Alumni Achievement Award, New England College
- 1996 Honorary Board Member, James Renwick Alliance
- 1989 Fellowship, National Endowment for the Arts/Southern Arts Federation
- 1985 New Works Grant, Fuller Museum of Art, Brockton, Mass. Council on the Arts and Humanities
- 1984 Individual Artist Grant, N.H. Commission on the Arts
- 1983 New England Living Art Treasure, University of Massachusetts at Amherst
- 1979 MacDowell Colony Fellowship, MacDowell Colony, Peterborough, N.H.

== Publications ==
- Spalted Wood, Fine Woodworking Vol 2 No. 1, Taunton Press, 1977
- Turning Spalted Wood, Fine Woodworking, Taunton Press, 1978
- Harvesting Burls, Fine Woodworking, Taunton Press, July August 1984, No. 47
- Sculpting Wood: Contemporary Tools & Techniques, Davis Publications Inc., U.S. 1986 ISBN 978-0-87192-177-2 and Sterling Press 1990 ISBN 978-0-87192-228-1
- Reinventing Sculpture, (Keynote speech given at the launch of Wood Turning In North America Since 1930 at The Minneapolis Institute of The Arts) (Woodturning Center Archives, Philadelphia, PA)
