= Museum for Art in Wood =

Art museum in Philadelphia, Pennsylvania

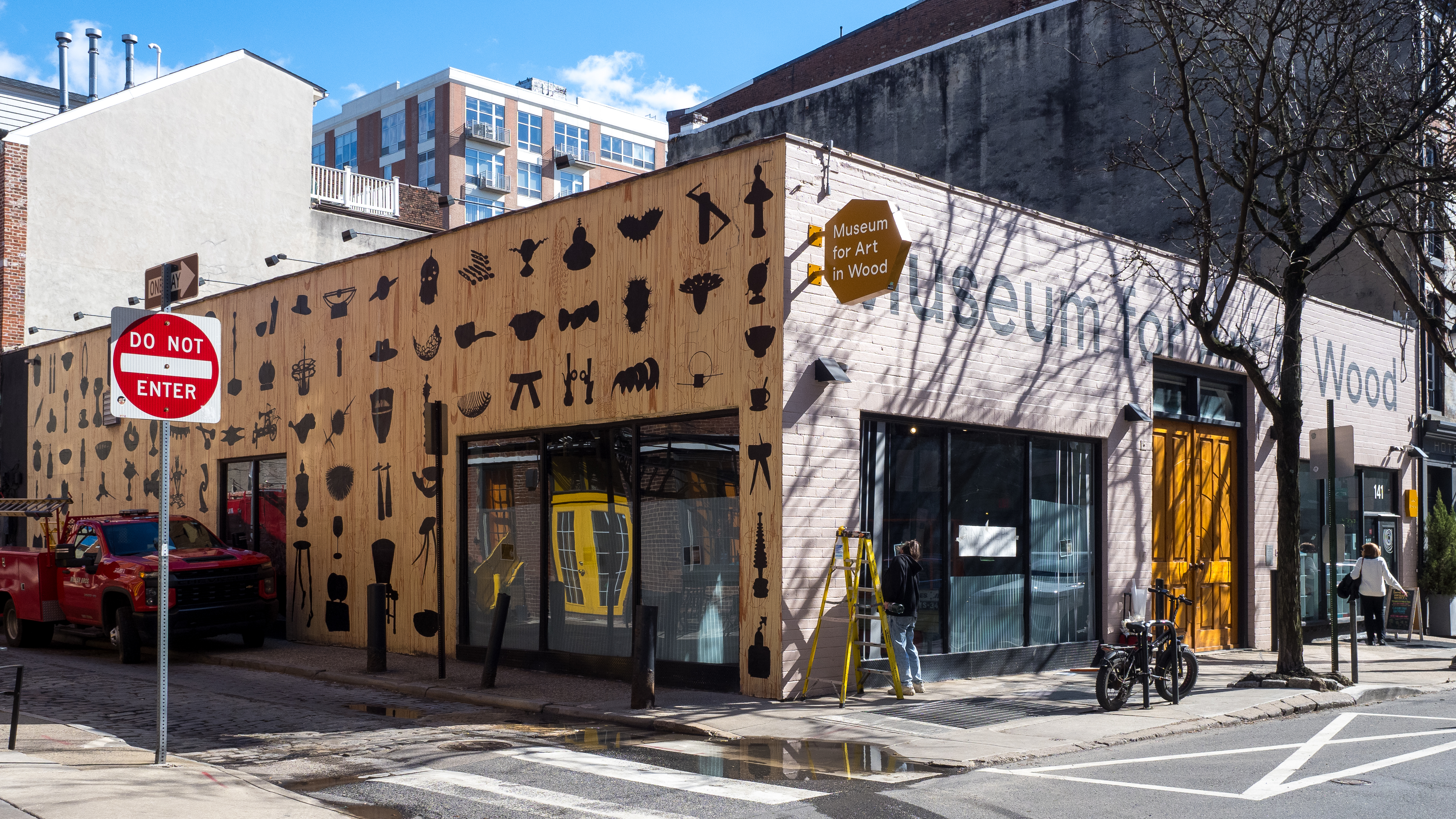
- Former name: Wood Turning Center; Center for Art in Wood
- Established: 1986
- Location: 141 N. 3rd St. Philadelphia, Pennsylvania, United States
- Coordinates: 39.95332°N 75.14477°W
- Type: Art Museum
- Visitors: 18,000 (2014)
- Directors: Jennifer-Navva Milliken, Executive Director and Chief Curator
- Website: www.MuseumForArtinWood.org

Museum for Art in Wood is an American educational wood art institution located in Philadelphia, Pennsylvania. It was officially established as a nonprofit in 1986 by brothers Albert and Alan LeCoff, following a series of international symposiums from 1976 to 1986 presented by the LeCoff's with woodturner Palmer Sharpless. The organization operated as the Wood Turning Center until 2011, when the nonprofit moved to its current location in Old City District of Philadelphia and changed its name to The Center for Art in Wood. As of January 30, 2023 the center has changed its name to Museum for Art in Wood to more accurately reflect its operations, resources, and programming scope.

Today, the Museum presents changing exhibitions of contemporary art work in the medium of wood, a permanent collection of over 1,300 pieces and a host of educational programs and workshops. The Museum also houses a research library, artists files, and a museum store. A series of publications documents the Museum's work and highlights artists from around the world dedicated to art in wood, including wood turning, sculpture, contemporary studio craft, studio furniture, new media, and more. The Museum also organizes annual arts residencies in Philadelphia, among them the renowned international Windgate Arts Residency Program in Wood (formerly International Turning Exchange), which was established in 1995. The Winter Residency is a new program created in 2021 as a collaboration between the Museum and NextFab, a network of membership-based maker spaces. The residency is for artists working in wood in the Greater Philadelphia region who demonstrate a commitment to environmental stewardship and sustainable practices.
