= Merryll Saylan =

American woodworker

Merryll Saylan (born 1936) is an American woodturner. She is credited with helping pioneer the popularization of the woodturning field and the application of color in wood art. She is noted as being one of the few women in the craft field, when she first began turning during the 1970s.

== Early life ==
Merryll Saylan was born in 1936 in the Pelham Parkway area of The Bronx borough of New York City. She moved to and lived in Los Angeles in her youth, where she had an early musical education in piano and viola. She attended UCLA right after graduating high school, where she met her first husband, but would drop out. She ended up attending UCLA once again, after first taking some classes at Santa Monica City College.

== Woodturning ==
Saylan began woodturning in the mid-1970s. On her earliest works, Saylan recalled, "When I first started I had been making sculpture, but to pay my studio rent, started turning bowls. I also made turned and constructed furniture." In 1982, a house's workshop space in Berkeley, California, caught the attention of Saylan and her partner, Edward Saylan. The two, with the help of fellow artist friends, would remodel the house over the next three decades or so.

Saylan came from a background in modern and contemporary design. During her second tenure attending UCLA for her undergraduate studies, she chose design as her major. During her time in college, she tended to her three children after classes. She was one of the first women in the woodturning field; in an interview with the American Association of Woodturners (AAW), she stated, "It was definitely a guy's game in the beginning. I remember reading that in one of the earliest newsletters."

From the early 1980s on, Saylan helped pioneer the application of color in wood art. Additionally, her combining of materials, as well as the surface texturing in her works, helped make her pieces more unique during an era of wood art in which furniture-making was the norm and the natural look of the wood was a primary concern. The Seattle Post-Intelligencer commented that her Jelly Donut (1979) work "incorporates one segment of red resin, as if a prosthetic body part," for example. She completed her M.A. in studio art at CSUN.

In 1986, she became a member of the newly established AAW and would serve as president of its board from 1995 to 1996. At the request of Art in Embassies, Saylan visited Fiji in February 2004, where she presented her work and held workshops for students and local art organizations. The U.S. Department of State noted that Saylan's visit prompted attention from the Fijian media and was "covered extensively by a few national papers as well as a nationally televised channel."

Saylan's life and work are documented in the Smithsonian American Art Museum. Several of her works are exhibited in museums across the United States; the Mint Museum of Craft + Design in Charlotte, North Carolina houses her Jelly Donut, as well as her Untitled (1998) piece. In 2016, Saylan was noted by the AAW to reside and continue to work in Berkeley, California. In 2018, however, Saylan put her Berkeley home up for sale and moved to Colorado to live closer to her son and grandchildren.
