= Bucklebury =

Village in Berkshire, England

Coordinates: 51°26′02″N 1°12′25″W

- Village and civil parish
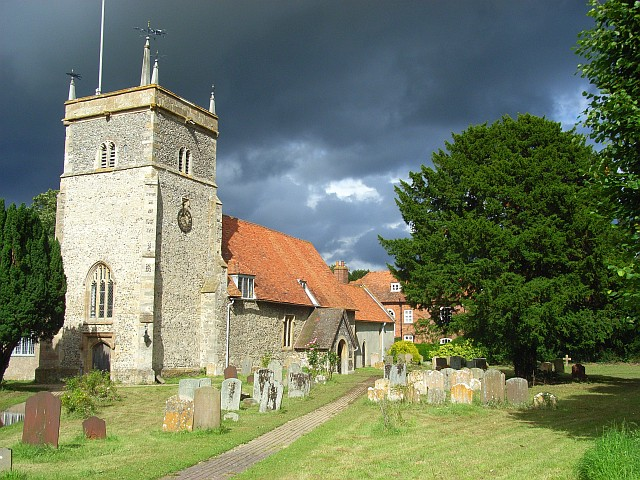
- St Mary the Virgin parish church

- Location within Berkshire
- Area: 21.82 km^{2} (8.42 sq mi)
- Population: 2,116 (parish in 2011 census)
  - Density: 97/km^{2} (250/sq mi)
- OS grid reference: SU5570
- Civil parish: Bucklebury
- Unitary authority: West Berkshire
- Ceremonial county: Berkshire
- Region: South East
- Country: England
- Sovereign state: United Kingdom
- Post town: Reading
- Postcode district: RG7
- Police: Thames Valley
- Fire: Royal Berkshire
- Ambulance: South Central
- UK Parliament: Reading West and Mid Berkshire
- Website: The Bucklebury Wikispace

Bucklebury is a village and civil parish in West Berkshire, England, about 5 miles (8 km) north-east of Newbury and 1–3 miles (1.6–4.8 km) north of the A4 road. The parish has a population of 2,116, but the village is much smaller. Bucklebury Common, with an area of over 1 square kilometre (0.39 sq mi), is one of the largest commons in the ceremonial and historic county of Berkshire.

== Toponymy ==
The place-name "Bucklebury" is first attested in the Domesday Book of 1086, where it appears as Borgeldeberie, which means "Burghild's fortified place or borough" ("Burghild" is a woman's name).

== Geography ==
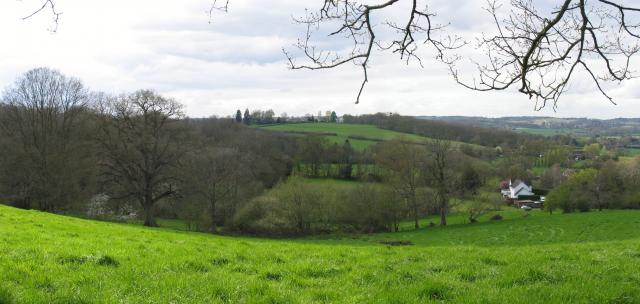
Hillfoot Farm

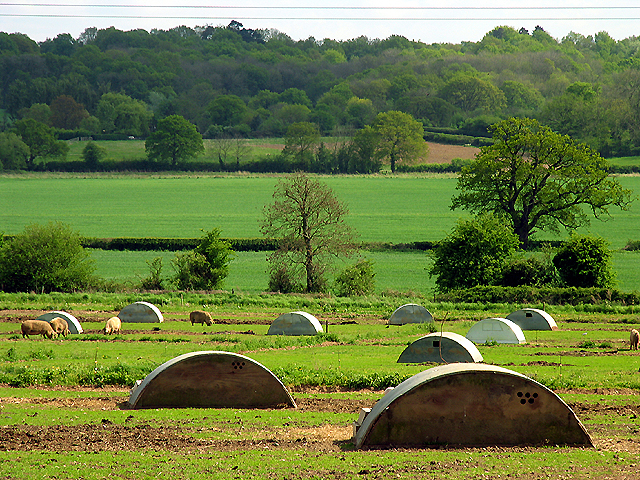
New Barn Farm, Pig Farm

The parish of Bucklebury has three main parts. The original village is on the banks of the River Pang close to its three sources in the parish. Directly south of Bucklebury village and on higher ground is Bucklebury Common, which is 826 acres (334 ha) of open grazing on managed heather and woodland. The common is, under the Inclosure Acts, open to villagers only as commoners and privately owned. At the eastern boundary of the common is Chapel Row, incorporating local landmarks such as the Blade Bone public house, a doctors' surgery and a teashop.

The village of Upper Bucklebury became the parish's largest residential area in the late 20th century. This is on a hill about a 1.5 miles (2.4 km) south-west of Bucklebury village at the western tip of the common. Upper Bucklebury has a general store, a public house, a modern Church of England church, All Saints, and a Church of England primary school.

The hamlet of Marlston is also in the parish. It is mostly fields, with a smaller area of woodland.

== History ==
Bucklebury was a royal manor owned by Edward the Confessor (reigned 1042–66). The village and parish church are recorded in the Domesday Book of 1086. Henry I (reigned 1100–35) granted Bucklebury to the Cluniac Reading Abbey, which retained it until it lost all its lands to the Crown with the Dissolution of the Monasteries in 1540.

Wooden bowl-making was "still carried on" in 1923 on or next to Bucklebury Common using its wood. Until 1950, such wood was also used by handle-maker Harry J. Wells. Over 100 tools used at his workshop at Heatherdene, Bucklebury Common are in the Museum of English Rural Life collection.

In the Second World War much of Bucklebury Common was cleared for the stationing of troops. Some of the concrete paths laid down still remain and are now used as bridleways.

== Notable buildings ==
=== Parish church ===
The Church of England parish church of Saint Mary has a style consistent with being built in the second half of the 11th century. The ornate south doorway is late Norman and was added in about 1170. A north transept was added to the nave at the end of the 12th or beginning of the 13th century. Late in the 13th century, a second arch was added to turn the transept into a two-bay north aisle. One of the windows in the south wall of the nave was added in the 14th century.

In the 15th century, the nave and north aisle were lengthened westwards by adding a third bay, and new east and two new north windows were inserted in the north aisle. In the second half of the 15th century, the Perpendicular Gothic bell tower was added. The chancel was rebuilt in 1591 and the porch was added in 1603. The chancel was partly rebuilt again in 1705 and the porch has also been rebuilt. A vestry has also been added. The church contains tombs of the Winchcombe family. The whole structure is nationally listed for heritage/architecture in the highest category, Grade I.

The Rectory has an early 18th-century frontage. In 1966 the garden included two sculptures by Henry Moore: Draped Reclining Woman 1957–1958 and Reclining Figure (1961–1962).

==== Ministry and worship ====
The ecclesiastical parish has very similar boundaries to the civil (secular) parish and gives its name to a benefice of three churches. This reaches into two parishes to the east to provide six churches, each with its own style of worship. A late December carol service and separate Christmas Eve and Christmas Day communions are held. 2bsd is the collective name for the churches of Bucklebury, Bradfield and Stanford Dingley. The parishes of Bucklebury with Marlston, Bradfield and Stanford Dingley from a group of rural parishes with six very different church buildings architecturally as well.

=== Bucklebury House and estate ===
The 1,600–acre (647 ha) agricultural Bucklebury manor estate was confiscated from Reading Abbey at the Dissolution of the Monasteries in 1540 and granted to John Winchcombe (died 1557), who built himself a fine Elizabethan mansion. When it was owned by the Hartley family, a fire in 1830 destroyed the greater part of the house, which was later demolished. The parts left standing were the kitchen, with a huge fireplace, the brewhouse, and the stables, which had been rebuilt by Winchcombe's descendant-in-law, Lord Bolingbroke in the early 18th century, although on the stables is a date 1626 with the initials H. W. for Henry Winchcombe (died 1642).

After the fire, the family built themselves a smaller house on the estate, eventually called Bucklebury Manor, but for the most part they lived on their Gloucestershire estates instead. When the last of the Hartleys died in 1881, Bucklebury and the other family estates passed to four sisters: the Countess de Palatiano, Mrs Webley-Parry, Mrs Acreman White, and Mrs Charles Russell. Their families each became lords of the manor in turn and lived at the smaller Bucklebury Manor until 1957. In that year, Major Derrick Hartley Russell restored the remains of the old mansion to form the present Bucklebury House. His son, Willie, is the current lord of the manor.

=== Bucklebury Manor ===
This is a small Georgian country house on Pease Hill, which briefly served as the local manor house between 1906 and 1957. It is currently the home Michael and Carole Middleton, the parents of the Princess of Wales.

== Demography ==
2011 Published Statistics: Population, home ownership and extracts from Physical Environment, surveyed in 2005
Output area	Homes owned outright	Owned with a loan	Socially rented	Privately rented	Other	km^{2} roads	km^{2} water	km^{2} domestic gardens	Usual residents	km^{2}
Civil parish	354	286	114	60	10	0.223	0.071	1.090	2116	21.82

== In popular culture ==
In Tolkien's legendarium "Bucklebury Ferry" is run by Buckland Hobbits to Bucklebury, their main town, across the Brandywine river.

== Notable residents ==
In birth order:

- Henry St John, 1st Viscount Bolingbroke (1678–1751), politician and philosopher
- Henry Octavius Coxe (1811–1881), librarian and scholar
- George Palmer (1818–1897), proprietor of the Huntley & Palmers biscuit manufacturers
- George William Palmer (1851–1913), Liberal Member of Parliament, son of George Palmer
- George Lailey (1869–1958), last professional practitioner of the craft of bowl-turning using a pole lathe
- Hutin Britton (1876–1965), actress
- Herbert Farjeon (1887–1945), English theatre critic, lyricist, librettist, playwright, theatre manager and researcher, at Spring Cottage
- Robert Still (1910–1971), composer
- Coral Atkins (1936–2016), actress, known for A Family at War and Emmerdale.
- Chris Tarrant (born 1946) OBE, TV and radio presenter
- Carole Middleton (born 1955), mother of Catherine, Princess of Wales, Philippa Matthews (born 1983), and James Middleton (born 1987)
- Catherine, Princess of Wales (born 1982), wife of William, Prince of Wales, heir to the British throne
