= Rude Osolnik =

American woodturner (1915–2001)

- Born: March 4, 1915; Dawson, New Mexico, U.S.
- Died: November 18, 2001 (aged 86); Berea, Kentucky, U.S.
- Education: Bradley University
- Occupations: Craftsman, artist, design, author, educator
- Known for: Woodturning
- Movement: American studio woodturning movement
- Website: Official website

Rude Osolnik (1915–2001), was an American woodturner, author, and educator. He is considered an important figure within the American studio woodturning movement and in contemporary woodturning in the United States. He was the department head in the woodcraft industry program at Berea College for forty years. Osolnik was elected as an American Craft Council (ACC) honorary fellow in 1994.

== Biography ==
Rude Osolnik was born March 4, 1915, in Dawson, New Mexico. He was the child of Slovenian immigrants. Osolnik graduated in 1937 from Bradley University in Peoria, Illinois.

Osolnik taught at Berea College in Berea, Kentucky from 1937 until 1978, initially working in the industrial arts department and later as the department head in the woodcraft industry program. He took a break from teaching to serve in the U.S. Navy during World War II. He also spent a lot of time working at the Arrowmont School of Arts and Crafts in Gatlinburg, Tennessee.

Osolnik has work in museum collections, including at the Smithsonian American Art Museum, the High Museum of Art, the Detroit Institute of Arts, the Philadelphia Museum of Art, and the Minneapolis Institute of Art.

He died of congestive heart failure on November 18, 2001, at Poverty Ridge in Berea, Kentucky.

== See also ==
- List of woodcarvers
- Bob Stocksdale
