= Norm Sartorius =

American woodworker (born 1947)

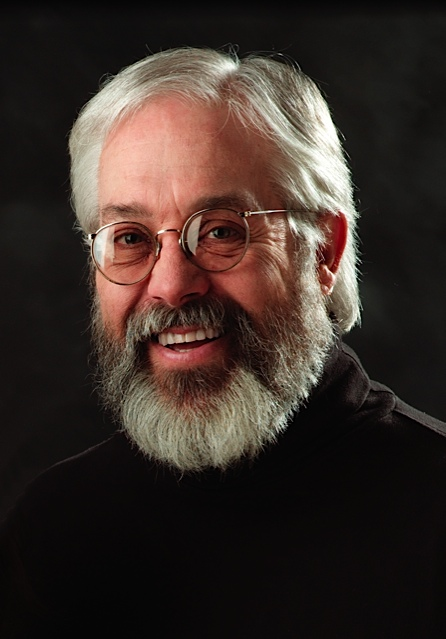
- Norm Sartorius in 2004
- Born: Salisbury, Maryland
- Education: Western Maryland College (now McDaniel College), Westminster, MD
- Occupation: Carver of fine wooden spoons
- Notable work: Conquistador (Renwick Gallery); Homage (Yale Art Gallery); Spoon From a Forgotten Ceremony (Detroit Institute of Art)
- Style: Sculptural, biomorphic
- Awards: Award of Excellence, Smithsonian Craft Show; Excellence in Wood, American Craft Council; Best of Show, Philadelphia Museum of Art Craft Show
- Website: normsartorius.com

Norm Sartorius is an American woodworker who carves fine art spoons in many styles. His works are in the permanent collections of the Smithsonian American Art Museum's Renwick Gallery, the Yale University Art Gallery, the Philadelphia Museum of Art, and other public and private collections. He is a frequent participant in woodworking and craft shows in America.

== Early life and education ==
Born in Salisbury, Maryland, Sartorius grew up on Maryland's Eastern Shore, the son of a country doctor. In interviews, he said that the arts were not emphasized in his family, but he was highly attuned to nature as a child.

He received his BA in Psychology from Western Maryland College (now McDaniel College) in 1969, then worked as a psychiatric social worker for five years at Spring Grove State Hospital in Catonsville, Maryland. He changed careers and completed an apprenticeship with crafters Phil and Sandye Jurus (Jurus Studio, Baltimore), who had studied with Emil Milan. There, he learned how to make small functional wooden items, including spoons.

== Career ==
In the mid-1970s, he moved to rural West Virginia and started selling wooden works, including cutting boards, pie servers, canes, knife racks, and spoons at regional craft fairs. At Winterfair, an annual Ohio Designer Craftsmen show in Columbus, Ohio, he met studio furniture maker Bobby Reed Falwell, who encouraged him to focus on spoons and to see spoons as small sculptures. He was an assistant for 18 months at Falwell's studio in Murray, KY in 1980-81.

Early exhibitions of his fine art spoons included the West Virginia Craft Exhibit at the Union Carbide Gallery, New York City (1977) and an invitational exhibit of West Virginia craft at the Renwick Gallery of the Smithsonian's American Art Museum in Washington, DC (1979). In 1978, a work of his was selected for the Fine Woodworking Design Book. (Note: Sartorius' works have appeared in the Fine Woodworking Design Book four times (1978, 1983, 1987, and 1996)) He was juried into the American Craft Council craft show in Baltimore for the first time 1979. In 1981, and again in 1989 and 1991, he received the Governor's Award of Excellence at the West Virginia Juried Exhibition, resulting in the works being purchased for the state's permanent craft collection. The annual Mountain State Art and Craft Fair in Ripley, WV was particularly important as a proving ground for his maturing design style and craft business.

In 1986, his spoons were featured in an exhibit at the Pro-Art Gallery in St. Louis in conjunction with the Craft Alliance's high-level Wooden Vessels exhibit. Other early exhibits included the Huntington Gallery (WV) traveling craft exhibit (1985–86); another exhibit at the Pro-Art Gallery entitled The Medium is Wood (1987); and the exhibit Contemporary Works in Wood at the Cultural Arts Center, Athens, Ohio (1986, 1989). The 1990 American Craft Council show in Atlanta has been cited as a major turning point for Sartorius' career. He focused exclusively on high end spoons and redesigned his booth to create a gallery-like environment, presenting each spoon as a sculpture.

Since 2008 and as of 2011, he was co-directing a grant-funded research project on the life, work, and legacy of American woodworker Emil Milan.

== Artistic approach and influences ==
Sartorius has stated that he sees the concept of "spoon" like any other craft category such as "bowl," "plate," or "teapot," in that each allows endless exploration of form, size, color, texture, symbolism, meaning, and emotional valence. His works have been said to not only "explore the possibilities of what it means to be a spoon," but "play with deep-seated assumptions regarding a spoon's characteristics." He has stated that, "Spoons are an infinite category. You can make thousands and no two are alike."

He credits James Krenov's book A Cabinetmakers' Notebook (1976) with stimulating his sensitivity to the unique character of each piece of wood. He attributes his sculptural style that shuns embellishment in favor of pure line and form to Emil Milan, an American woodworker who trained as a sculptor. Although Sartorius never met Milan, his first mentors, Phil and Sandye Jurus, studied with Milan and passed on key aspects of his approach and tool use. Sartorius' sculpture Homage now in the Yale University Art Gallery is a tribute to Milan. Other acknowledged influences are Dona Meilach's books on small wooden works and articles in the early volumes of Fine Woodworking magazine.

Sartorius has acknowledged several sources of inspiration. First, he has drawn on spoon-making traditions in diverse cultures ranging from Northwest Coast Native American horn spoons to carved spoons from West Africa. In 1996, he obtained a grant to study and photograph spoons from around the world at the Smithsonian's repository in Suitland, MD. Second, he stated in an interview that he "sees spoons" in everything, particularly in natural forms such as seedpods, leaves, flowers, and found and weathered objects. It has been noted that the influence of seashells, crustaceans, shore birds and other sealife often show through in this work. Third, he is inspired by the wood itself, particularly contrasting heartwood and sapwood colors, unusual grain, knots, textures, or weathering in a piece. Every piece he crafts, he has said, "starts with the wood itself." He has estimated that the characteristics of the piece of wood itself suggest the size and shape of more than 75% of his finished pieces.

Overall, he has described his creative approach as intuitive in that he reacts to the virtues of each piece of wood rather than forcing his own design intentions. "The wood is usually the inspiration for the first cuts," he has said, "And the shape of the piece has to do with the texture, grain, and figure of it..." He has stated that he places his most interesting pieces of wood within sight of his workbench, often for months, to contemplate possible spoons may that lie within. Once he sees the spoon a piece can become, he has said, he acts quickly on the idea because he feels his creative inspirations cannot be turned on and off at will, but must be recognized and acted upon.

== Wood, tools, and work process ==
Sartorius prefers to work with very dense hardwood, especially root wood and burls with contrasting heartwood and sapwood colors, figured grain, and unique character from knots, deformities, damage, weathering, or other idiosyncrasies. Frequently, he uses scraps or cutoffs sent to him by other woodworkers from around the world—often with an interesting background story. He, in turn, sends his scraps to carvers and jewelers who work at even smaller scale. The provenance of his raw materials contributes significantly to both the making and the sale of his spoons.

He follows the same sequence of steps when crafting his spoons. (Note: The tools and steps Sartorius uses to make his spoons have been described with a sequence of six photos in an article by Terry Martin in American Woodworker in June, 2006 (p.28). Explanatory text and commentary by Sartorius accompany each step. This is the most comprehensive description of the artist's work process.) First, he uses a bandsaw to roughly shape the overall form of the spoon. Then, an inflatable sanding drum with very coarse 24-grit sandpaper is used to remove saw marks, smooth out the facets of the cuts, and shape the convex curves of the exterior of the bowl. He determines the exterior shape first before working on the inside of the spoon bowl. "It fixes the outside form," he has said, "which is sculpturally what one sees first." A die grinder (rotary tool) with a carbide cutter is then used to remove mass from the concave interior of the bowl. Small cutters are used to further shape the piece, particularly the transition between the bowl and the handle, which he sees as particularly critical. The fine details of the spoon are made with a carving knife, then a die grinder with a ball-shaped burr is used to clean up and refine the interior of the spoon bowl. This is followed by hours of hand work, sanding, scraping, and polishing the work.

== The Emil Milan research project ==
Since 2008, Sartorius has collaborated with woodworkers Phil Jurus and Barry Gordon on a research project focused on the life, work, and legacy of American master craftsman Emil Milan. Funded by a grant from the Center for Craft, Creativity, and Design, the Emil Milan Research Project has resulted in an article in Woodwork magazine and a research report containing extensive biographical and archival material. (Note: The Emil Milan Research Project Report (2011) is available from the Center for Craft, Creativity, and Design (Asheville, NC) and other repositories including the American Craft Council Library (Minneapolis), the Art Students League of New York, Peter's Valley School of Craft (NJ), the Sullivan County (PA) Historical Society, Smithsonian's Renwick Gallery (DC), the Yale University Art Gallery (New Haven), the Museum of Arts and Design (New York), and the Center for Art in Wood (Philadelphia).) Sartorius played a major role in curating the exhibit entitled Emil Milan: Midcentury Designer Craftsman held at the Henry Gallery on the campus of Penn State Great Valley in Malvern, PA June 9 – September 26, 2014. The exhibit, which included works by Sartorius, traveled to the Center for Art in Wood in Philadelphia and was expanded to include 19 artists influenced by Milan. The exhibit, entitled Rediscovering Emil Milan and his Circle of Influence, was held at the Center November 7, 2014 – January 24, 2015. Sartorius was a speaker and panelist at a symposium held in conjunction with the exhibit focusing on Milan’s life, work, and influence. (Note: Sponsored by the Center for Art in Wood and held in conjunction with the exhibit Rediscovering Emil Milan and His Circle of Influence, the Symposium took place at the studios of WHYY-TV in Philadelphia, January 15, 2015. Presenters included Milan experts Sartorius, Gordon, and Jurus; Elizabeth Agro from the Philadelphia Museum of Art; professional curators Jennifer Zwilling (Philadelphia) and Jennifer Scanlan (New York); Kristin Muller from Peters Valley School of Craft (NJ); Andrew Willner, professional woodworker and colleague of Milan's; and Milan's student and accomplished artist in wood Rebecca Dunn Penwell. The full video of the Symposium is available on the Center for Art in Wood's website.)

== Gallery ==
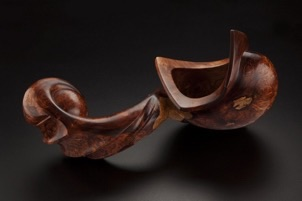
Conquistador
(Renwick Gallery)

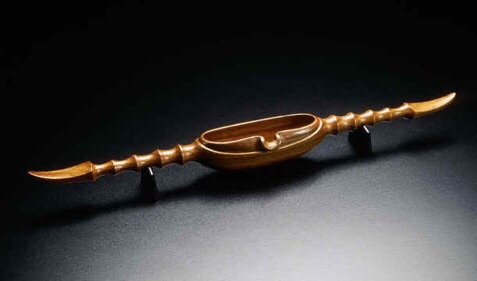
Spoon From A Forgotten Ceremony
(Arkansas Art Center)

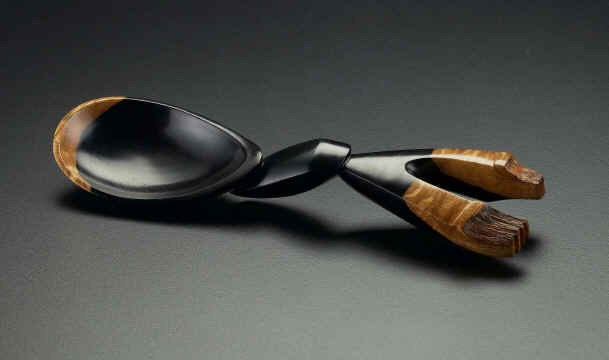
Man
(African blackwood)

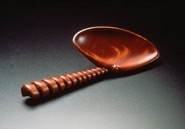
Assateague
(Crotch Mahogany)

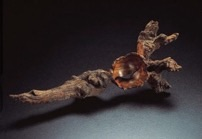
Headdress
(Texas desert wood)

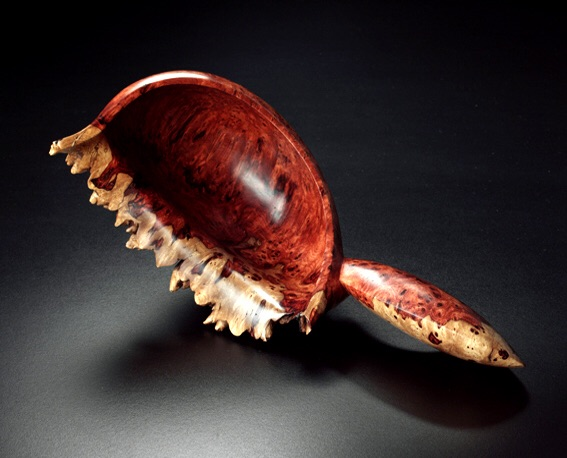
Fallingwater
(Amboyna burl)

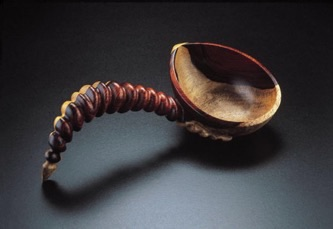
Bighorn
(Cocobolo)

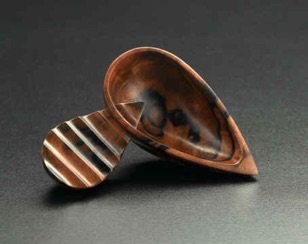
Get to the Point
(Macassar ebony)

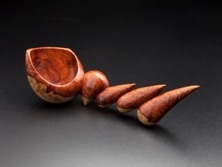
Perseid
(Amboyna burl)

== Shows and awards ==
Sartorius has participated in several juried craft shows each year including the Smithsonian Craft Show; the American Craft Council Fairs (principally Baltimore and Atlanta); the Philadelphia Museum of Art Craft Show; the American Craft Exposition (Evanston, IL); the West Palm Beach Craft Show; and Craft Boston, among others. He has won the Award of Excellence for wood at the Smithsonian Craft Show four times, most recently in 2015.

He won the Award of Excellence in Wood at the 2015 American Craft Council show in Baltimore and the 2015 Smithsonian Craft Show in Washington, DC. He has also won the Best of Show award and the Wharton Esherick Award at the Philadelphia Museum of Art Craft Show; and Best In Wood awards at both the Washington Craft Expo and the American Craft Exposition in Evanston, Illinois. In 2014, he was awarded a Fellowship by the Tamarack Artisan Foundation for lifetime achievement in the arts.

In 2025, he was named "Master of the Medium" (Wood) by the Smithsonian's James Renwick Alliance, and received a Distinguished Alumni Award from the Trustees of McDaniel College, MD.

== Exhibitions ==
Spoons to Stir the Soul (2022)

- Career retrospective exhibit at the Center for Art in Wood, Philadelphia, PA May–July 2022. Curated by Craig Edelbrock.

Wood: 25 Years of Innovation (2018)

- SPECIAL EXHIBIT - The Collectors of Wood Art Sculpture Objects Functional Art & Design - SOFA Chicago, November 1–4, 2018.

Why Wood? Contemporary Practice in a Timeless Material (2016)

- Sculptural Objects and Functional Art (SOFA Chicago) November 3–6, 2016 Collectors of Wood Art. Curated by Jennifer-Navva Milliken, Curator of Craft, Bellevue Arts Museum, Bellevue, WA.

Beyond Boundaries (2014)

- Sponsored by the Collectors of Wood Art and curated by Emily Zilber, Decorative Arts Curator, Museum of Fine Arts Boston, the Beyond Boundaries exhibit was held at the Sculptural Objects and Functional Art (SOFA Chicago) show in November 2014. It included Sartorius' work "Monument Valley" carved from Australian flame sheoak burl.

Nature in Craft (2013)

- Three spoons by Sartorius were in the Nature in Craft exhibit at the Wayne Art Center, Wayne, PA, December 2013 to January 2014. The exhibit sought to trace how artists incorporate nature in their works through material, concept and execution.

Across the Grain (2013)

- The Fuller Craft Museum, Brockton, MA, drew from turned and carved works, including eight spoons by Sartorius for the Across the Grain exhibit held April 10 – September 10, 2013.

Poplar Culture (2012)

- Celebrating a poplar tree that for decades graced Wharton Esherick's studio, the Wharton Esherick Museum distributed the wood to more than 40 woodworkers including Sartorius, who carved three spoons inspired by Esherick's unique studio furniture. The exhibit was held May–June 2012 at Historic Yellow Springs, Chester Springs, PA.

What is Beautiful?(2012)

- An exhibit at SOFA Chicago curated by Charlotte Wainwright, founding Director of the Gregg Museum of Art & Design, included two sculptural spoons by Sartorius entitled "Beneath The Surface" and "Classic, 2011."

Is Ornament a Crime? (2010)

- Curated by Cindi Straus, Director, Museum of Fine Arts, Houston, this exhibit was held at SOFA Chicago, November 2010. Sponsored by the Collectors of Wood Art, this exhibit re-examined the role of decoration in wood art.

A Revolution in Wood (2010)

- In 2010, the Smithsonian American Art Museum held a major exhibition of the collection of wood art by Fleur and Charles Bressler entitled A Revolution In Wood. The exhibit included six spoons by Sartorius, opened in the Renwick Gallery September 24, 2010 and ran through January 30, 2011 in Washington, DC.

A Gathering of Spoons (2010)

- Norman Stevens extensive collection of carved wooden spoons was the focus of an exhibit entitled "A Gathering of Spoons" held at the Gallery of Wood Art, St. Paul, MN, March 2 to May 24, 2010. A symposium on the exhibit was held at the American Association of Woodturners annual meeting, Hartford, CT, June 18 – 20, 2010.

DysFUNctional (2008-2011)

- The Center for Art in Wood's seventh "Challenge" to wood artists led to an exhibit of highly creative, often humorous, and entirely nonfunctional works entitled "DysFUNctional". Held at the Center in Philadelphia, PA, October 3, 2008 - January 17, 2009, the exhibit included Sartorius' work Old and In the Way made from desert wood from Texas. The exhibit toured five other venues across the US from 2009-2011.

Yale Collects Wood (2002)

- Pat Kane, Curator of American Decorative Arts at the Yale University Art Gallery drew from the gifts of John and Robyn Horn to create the exhibit Yale Collects Wood.

Wood--Small Treasures (2000-2002, 2004, 2006-2007, 2009)

- A series of exhibits held at del Mano Gallery, Los Angeles, California, have showcased smaller works by leading artists in wood.

Woodturning in North America Since 1930 (2001-2002)

- A collaboration between the Center for Art in Wood and the Yale University Art Gallery produced a major book on the evolution of woodturning in America and a corresponding exhibit that toured the Minneapolis Institute of Arts, Minneapolis, MN (2001); the Renwick Gallery, National Museum of American Art, Washington, DC (2002); and the Yale University Art Gallery, New Haven, CT (2002). The exhibit included a ceremonial spoon sculpture by Sartorius entitled Spoon From a Forgotten Ceremony.

Objects for Use: Handmade by Design (2001-2002)

- Letter openers by Sartorius were included in this exhibit of functional works at the American Craft Museum, New York, New York

Living With Form (2000)

- This exhibit focused on the collection of wood art by Robyn and John Horn, who have more than 50 spoons by Sartorius.

Art in Embassies Program (1998-2001)

- This program places works by American artists in US embassies around the world. A spoon from Fleur Bresler's collection was exhibited at the American Embassy, Brussels, Belgium.

Expressions in Wood (1997–98)

- Featuring masterworks from The Wornick Collection, including "Spoon From a Forgotten Ceremony," this exhibit toured the Oakland Museum of California, 1997; McAllen International Museum, McAllen, TX, 1997; and the American Craft Museum, NY, 1998

West Virginia Juried Exhibition (1995–96, 1999-2000, 2005, 2007, 2008)

- Sartorius has been selected many times for this exhibit in his home state by the West Virginia Department of Culture and History, Parkersburg, WV.

Challenge V, Lathe-Turned Objects, (1994–97)

- The fifth in the "Challenge" series to woodworkers, this exhibit by the Wood Turning Center (now Center for Art in Wood) in Philadelphia, PA was a breakthrough for Sartorius who added lathe work to his repertoire and opened up a new clientele of collectors. His iconic work "Spoon From a Forgotten Ceremony" toured with this exhibit starting at the Berman Museum Collegeville, PA to twelve other venues across the US.

The Year of American Craft (1993–94)

- President George H. W. Bush declared 1993 "The Year of American Craft," resulting several regional traveling exhibits. Sartorius' works were included in the exhibits at the Huntington Museum of Art, Huntington, WV; West Virginia Department of Cultural and History, Charleston;; Sunrise Museums, Charleston; and the Governor's Mansion, State of West Virginia.

== Permanent collections ==
Works by Sartorius are in permanent collections of many museums including the Arkansas Arts Center; the Carnegie Museum of Art (PA); the Center for Art in Wood (PA); the Fuller Craft Museum (MA); the Minneapolis Institute of Arts; the Museum of Art and Design (NY); the Museum of Fine Arts, Houston (TX); the Philadelphia Museum of Art; the Racine Art Museum (WI); the Art Institute of Chicago; the Smithsonian American Art Museum's Renwick Gallery (DC); and the Yale University Art Gallery (CT).

== Suggested resources ==
Edelbrock, C. (2023) Spoons to Stir the Soul: The World of Norm Sartorius. Philadelphia: Museum for Art in Wood.ISBN 9780962438592.

Craft In America (PBS Series) "Collectors" episode has a segment on Norm Sartorius, his creative and work process, and his major collectors. Aired November 2024. Available at craftinamerica.org.
