= Wood carving =

Form of working wood by means of a cutting tool

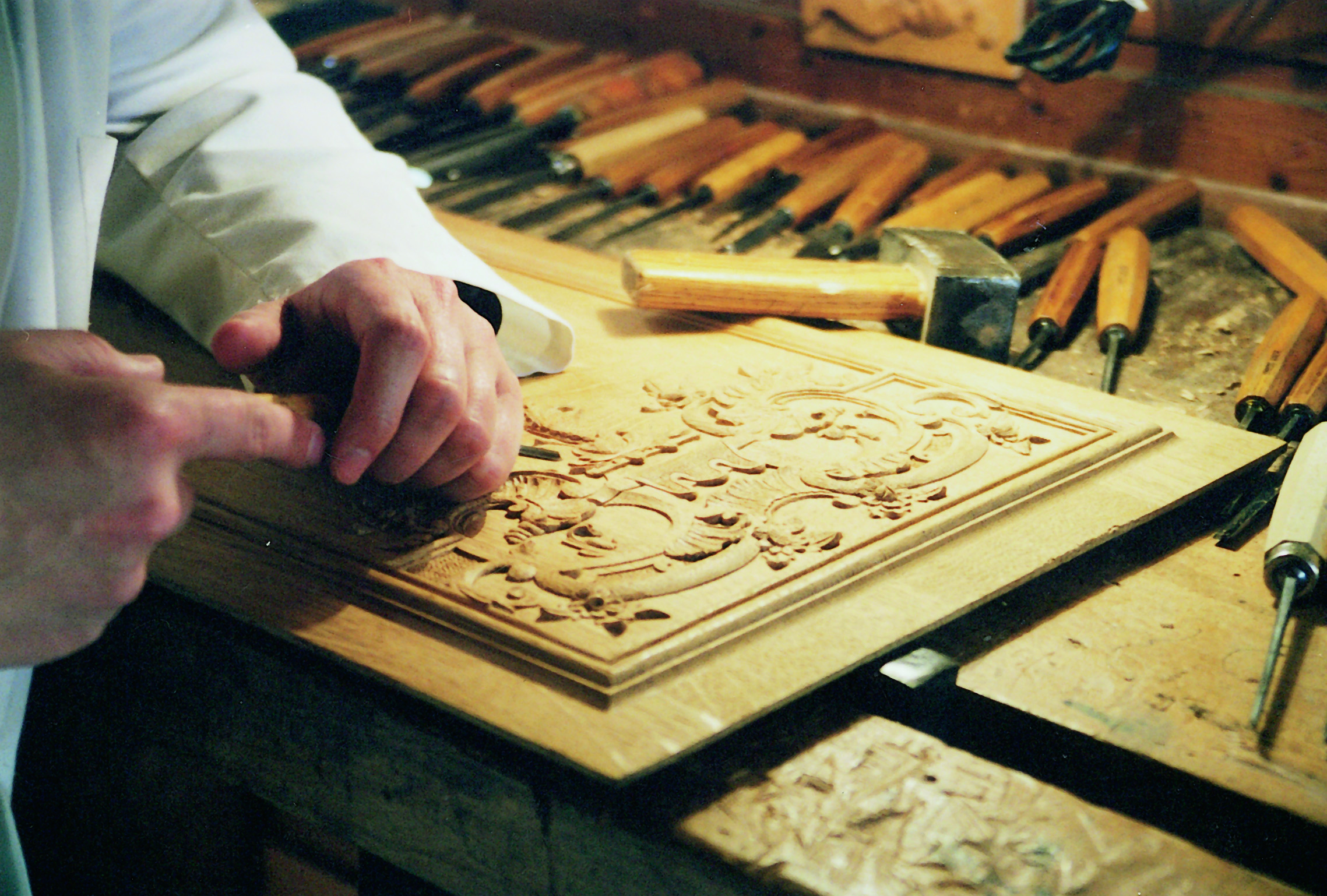
Woodcarver at work

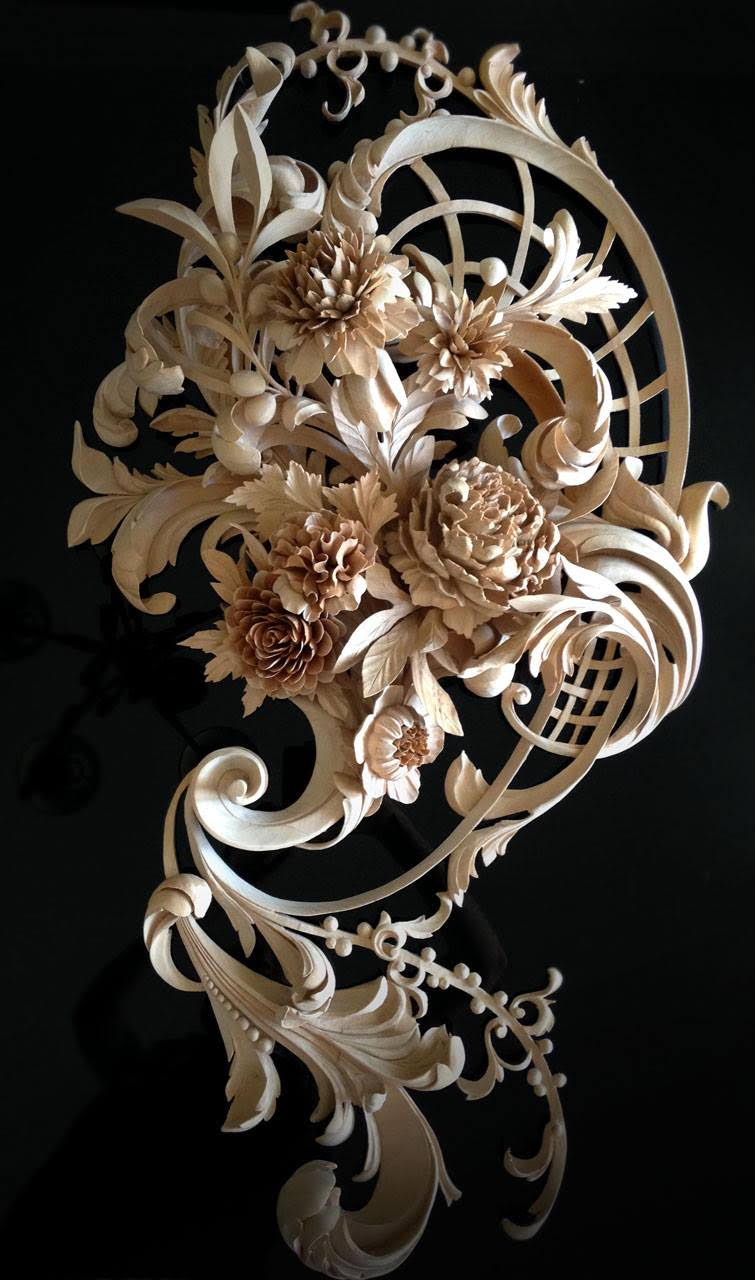
Wood sculpture made by Alexander Grabovetskiy

Wood carving, also spelt woodcarving, is a form of woodworking by means of a cutting tool (knife) in one hand or a chisel by two hands or with one hand on a chisel and one hand on a mallet, resulting in a wooden figure or figurine, or in the sculptural ornamentation of a wooden object. The phrase may also refer to the finished product, from individual sculptures to hand-worked mouldings composing part of a tracery.

== History ==
The making of sculpture in wood has been extremely widely practised, but does not survive undamaged as well as the other main materials like stone and bronze, as it is vulnerable to decay, insect damage, and fire. Therefore, it forms a more hidden element in the art history of many cultures. Outdoor wood sculptures do not last long in most parts of the world, so it is still unknown how the totem pole tradition developed. Many of the most important sculptures of China and Japan, in particular, are in wood, and so are the great majority of African sculpture and that of Oceania and other regions. Wood is light and can take very fine detail so it is highly suitable for masks and other sculpture intended to be worn or carried. It is also much easier to work on than stone and can be carved more thinly and precisely due to its fibrous strength.

Some of the finest extant examples of early European wood carving are from the Middle Ages in Germany, Russia, Italy, and France, where the typical themes of that era were Christian iconography. In England, many complete examples remain from the 16th and 17th centuries, where oak was the preferred medium.

The oldest wood carved sculpture, the Shigir Idol carved from larch, is around 12,000 years old.

== Methods and styles ==
Methods and styles of wood carving include:

- Chip carving
- Relief carving
- Scandinavian flat-plane
- Lovespoon
- Treen
- Whittling
- Chainsaw carving
- Florentine carving

== Tools ==
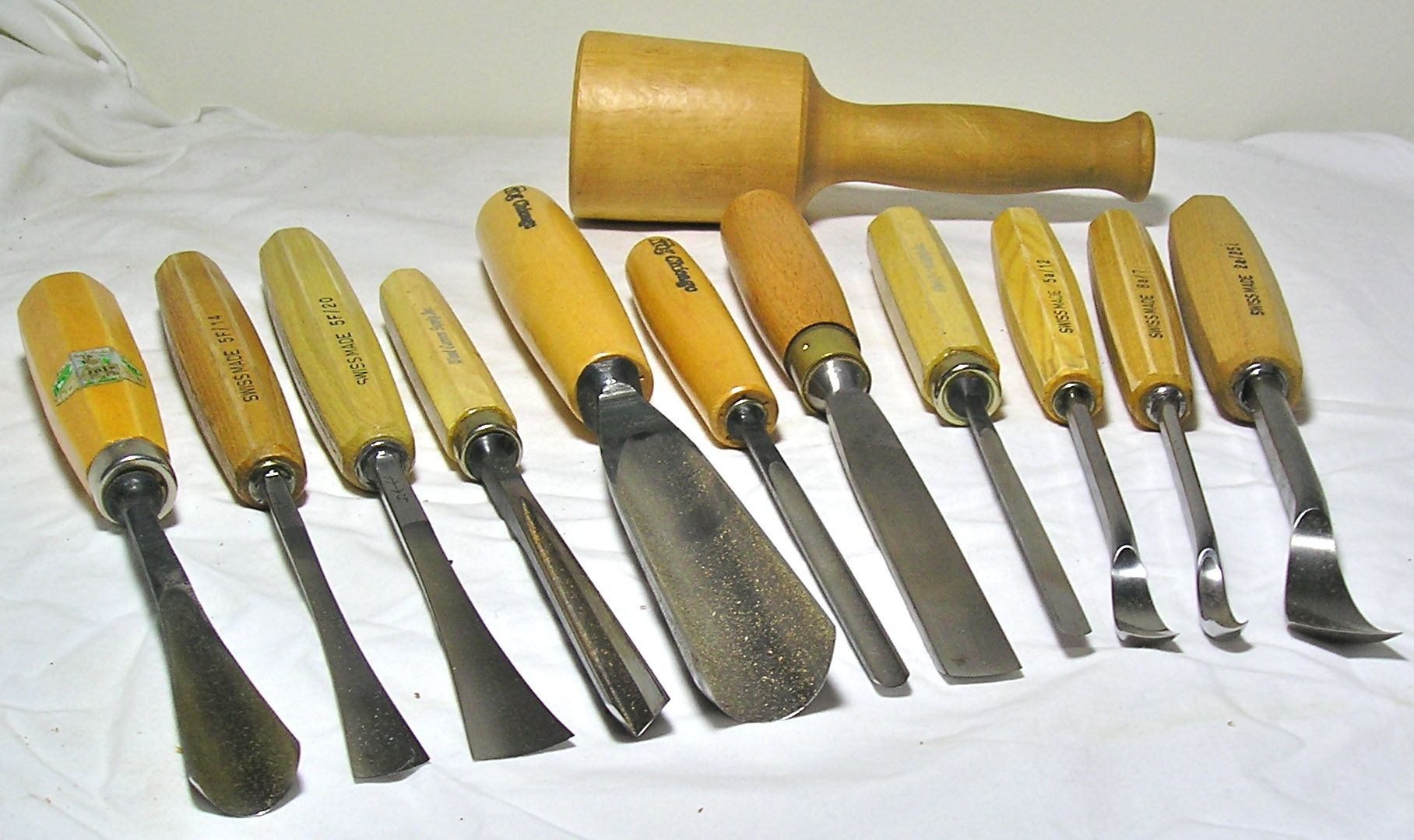
A selection of woodcarving hand tools: 3 fishtail gouges, a v-parting tool, 4 straight gouges, 3 spoon gouges, and a carver's mallet

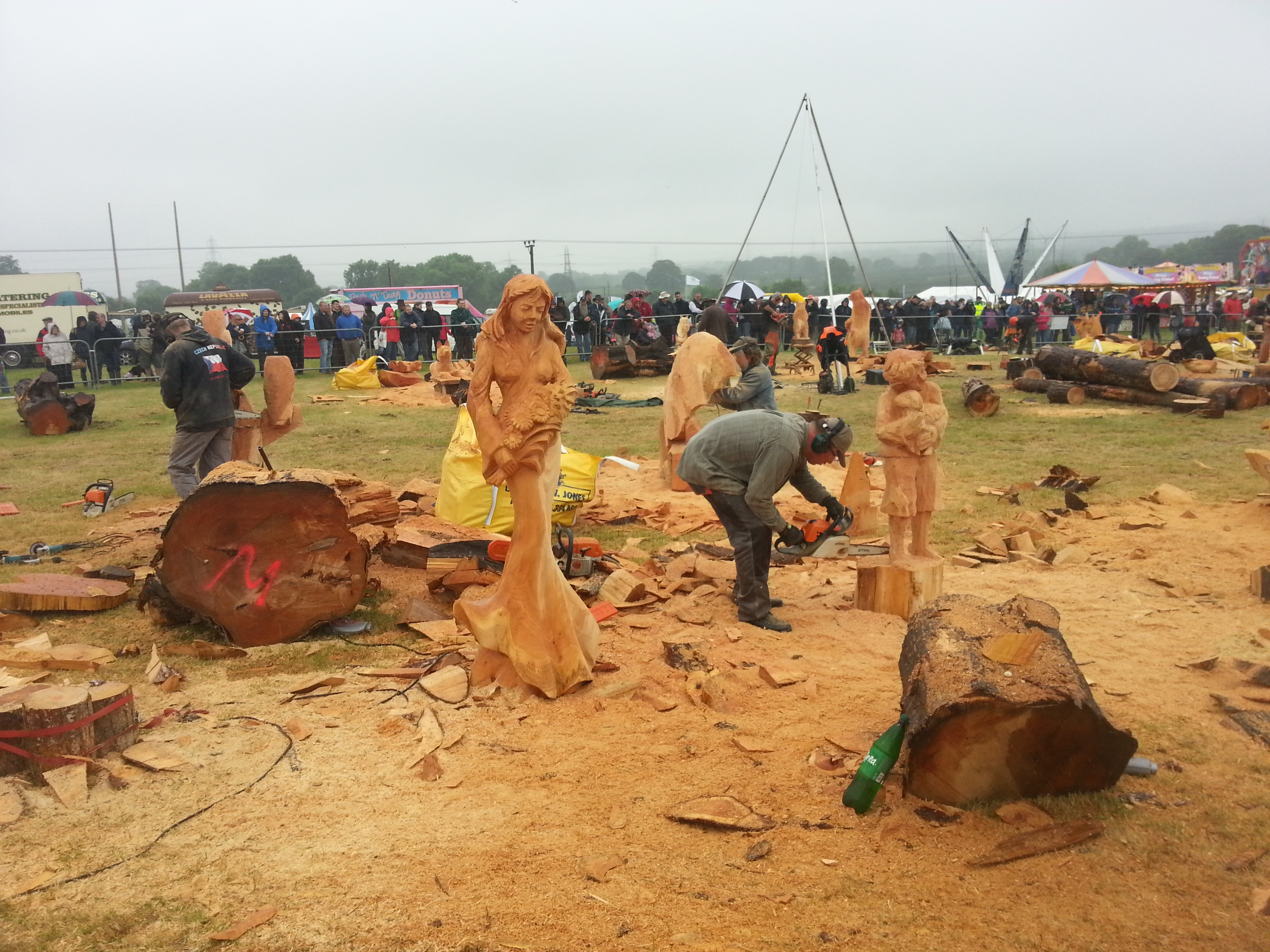
Wood carving with a chainsaw

A 3 meter long wooden crocodile, made for a playground in Ystad.

A number of types of hand tools are used for wood carving, including various types of gouges and mallets. It can also be done using mechanical means, such as with a chainsaw.

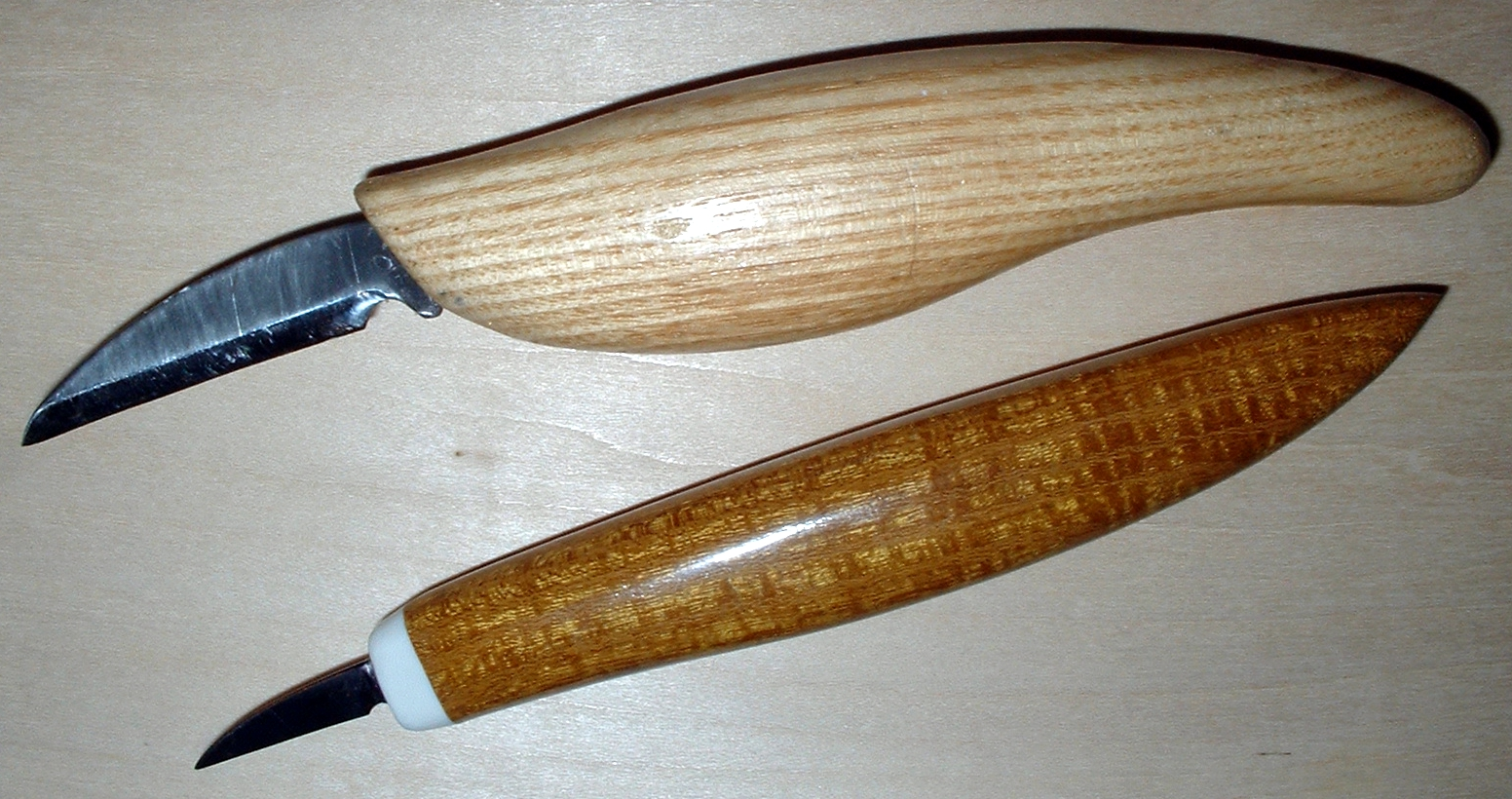
Carving knives

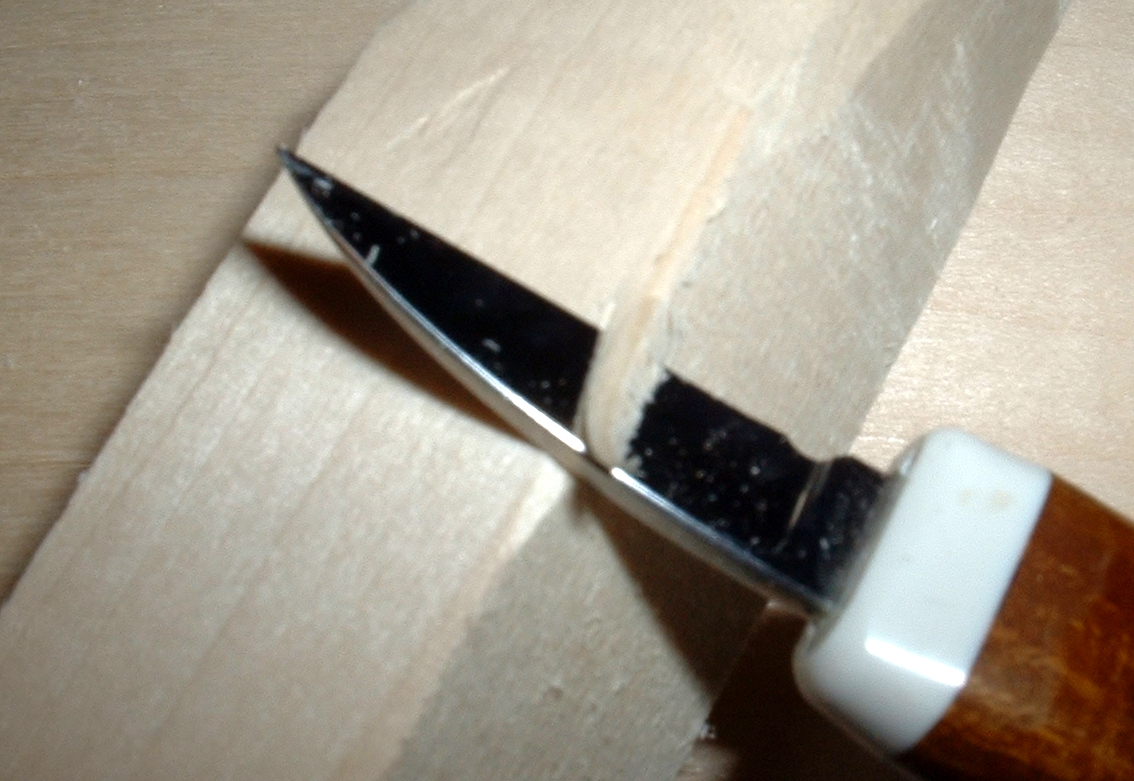
Carving knife used to round a corner of a piece of wood

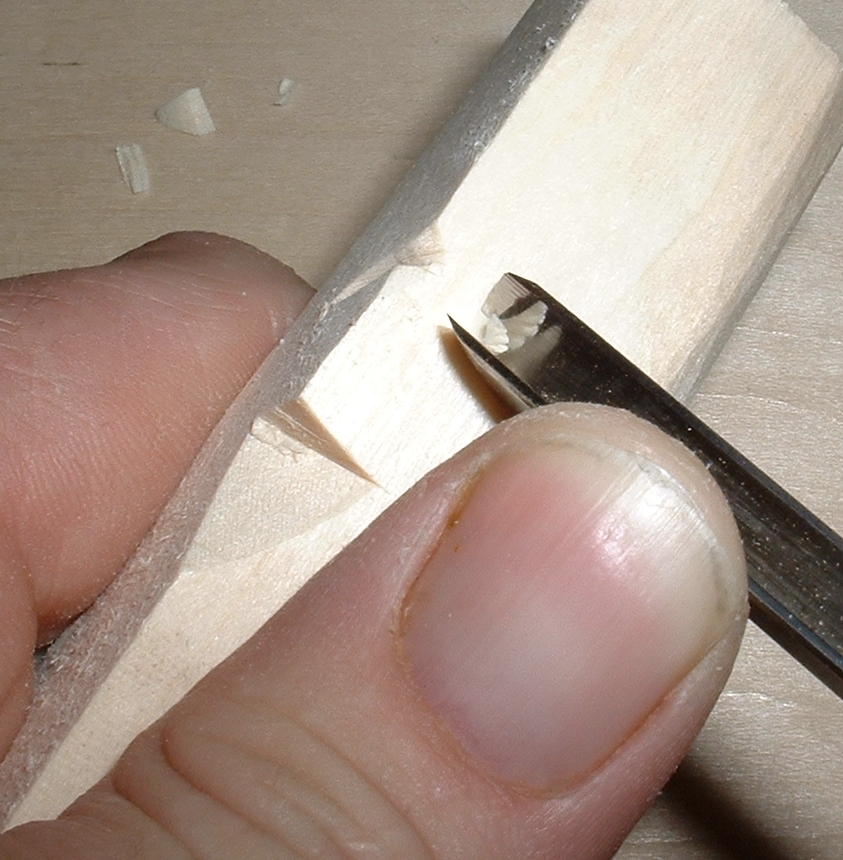
V-Tool used to part lines and cut V-shaped channels

== Process ==
=== Selection ===
The nature of the wood being carved limits the scope of the carver in that wood is not equally strong in all directions: it is an anisotropic material. The direction in which wood is strongest is called "grain" (grain may be straight, interlocked, wavy or fiddleback, etc.). It is smart to arrange the more delicate parts of a design along the grain instead of across it. Often, however, a "line of best fit" is instead employed, since a design may have multiple weak points in different directions, or orientation of these along the grain would necessitate carving detail on end grain, (which is considerably more difficult). Carving blanks are also sometimes assembled, as with carousel horses, out of many smaller boards, and in this way, one can orient different areas of a carving in the most logical way, both for the carving process and for durability. Less commonly, this same principle is used in solid pieces of wood, where the fork of two branches is utilized for its divergent grain, or a branch off of a larger log is carved into a beak (this was the technique employed for traditional Welsh shepherd's crooks, and some Native American adze handles). The failure to appreciate these primary rules may constantly be seen in damaged work, when it will be noticed that, whereas tendrils, tips of birds beaks, etc., arranged across the grain have been broken away, similar details designed more in harmony with the growth of the wood and not too deeply undercut remain intact.

Probably the two most common woods used for carving in North America are basswood (aka tilia or lime) and tupelo; both are hardwoods that are relatively easy to work with. Chestnut, butternut, oak, American walnut, mahogany and teak are also very good woods; while for fine work Italian walnut, sycamore maple, apple, pear, box or plum, are usually chosen. Decoration that is to be painted and of not too delicate a nature is often carved in pine, which is relatively soft and inexpensive.

=== Sculpture ===
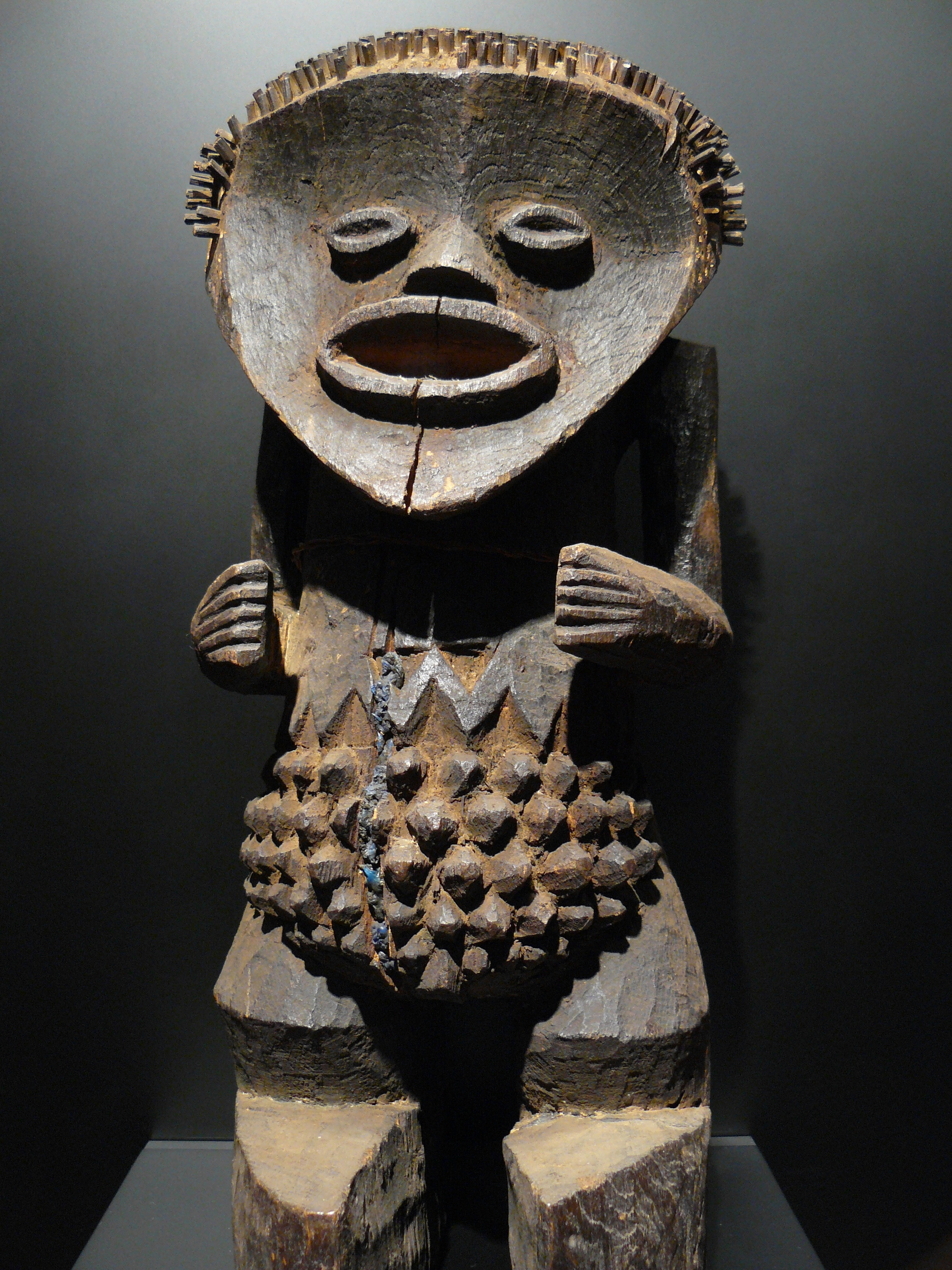
Mambila figure, Nigeria

A wood carver begins a new carving by selecting a chunk of wood the approximate size and shape of the figure they wish to create or if the carving is to be large, several pieces of wood may be laminated together to create the required size. The type of wood is important. Hardwoods are more difficult to shape but have greater luster and longevity. Softer woods may be easier to carve but are more prone to damage. Any wood can be carved but they all have different qualities and characteristics. The choice will depend on the requirements of carving being done: for example, a detailed figure would need a wood with a fine grain and very little figure as a strong figure can interfere with 'reading' fine detail.

Once the sculptor has selected their wood, they begin a general shaping process using gouges of various sizes. The gouge is a curved blade that can remove large portions of wood smoothly. For harder woods, the sculptor may use gouges sharpened with stronger bevels, about 35 degrees, and a mallet similar to a stone carver's. The terms gouge and chisel are open to confusion. Correctly, a gouge is a tool with a curved cross-section and a chisel is a tool with a flat cross-section. However, professional carvers tend to refer to them all as 'chisels'. Smaller sculptures may require the woodcarver to use a knife, and larger pieces might require the use of a saw. No matter what wood is selected or tool used, the wood sculptor must always carve either across or with the grain of the wood, never against the grain.

Once the general shape is made, the carver may use a variety of tools for creating details. For example, a "veiner" or "fluter" can be used to make deep gouges into the surface, or a "v-tool" for making fine lines or decorative cuts. Once the finer details have been added, the woodcarver finishes the surface. The method chosen depends on the required quality of the surface finish. The texture left by shallow gouges gives 'life' to the carving's surface and many carvers prefer this 'tooled' finish. If a completely smooth surface is required general smoothing can be done with tools such as "rasps," which are flat-bladed tools with a surface of pointed teeth. "Rifflers" are similar to rasps, but smaller, usually double-ended, and of various shapes for working in folds or crevasses. The finer polishing is done with abrasive paper. Large grained paper with a rougher surface is used first, with the sculptor then using finer grained paper that can make the surface of the sculpture slick to the touch.

After the carving and finishing is completed, the artist may seal & colour the wood with a variety of natural oils, such as walnut or linseed oil which protects the wood from dirt and moisture. Oil also imparts a sheen to the wood which, by reflecting light, helps the observer 'read' the form. Carvers seldom use gloss varnish as it creates too shiny a surface, which reflects so much light it can confuse the form; carvers refer to this as 'the toffee apple effect'. Objects made of wood are frequently finished with a layer of wax, which protects the wood and gives a soft lustrous sheen. A wax finish (e.g., shoe polish) is comparatively fragile though and only suitable for indoor carvings.

== Gallery ==
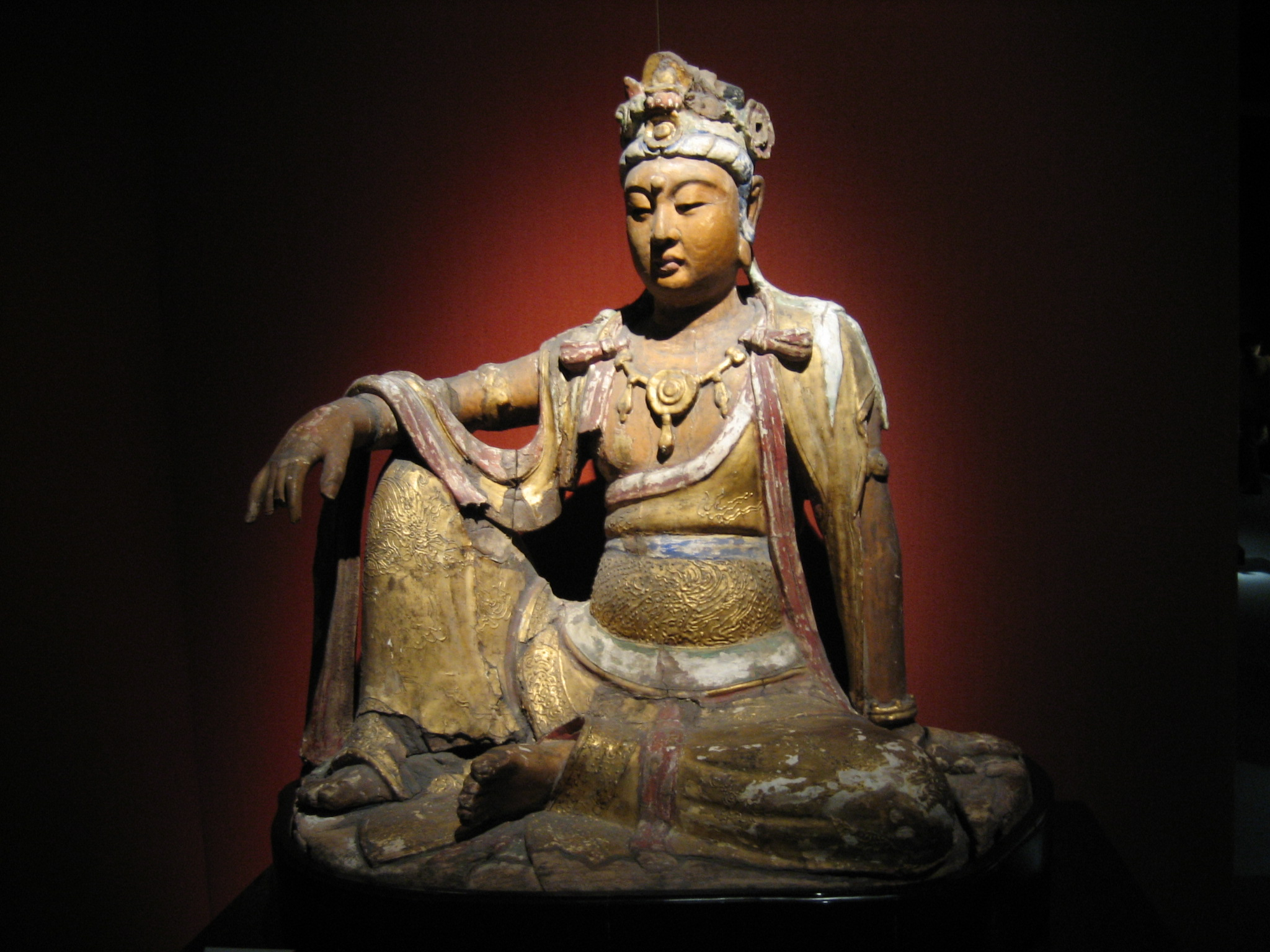
A wooden Bodhisattva from the Song dynasty (960–1279)

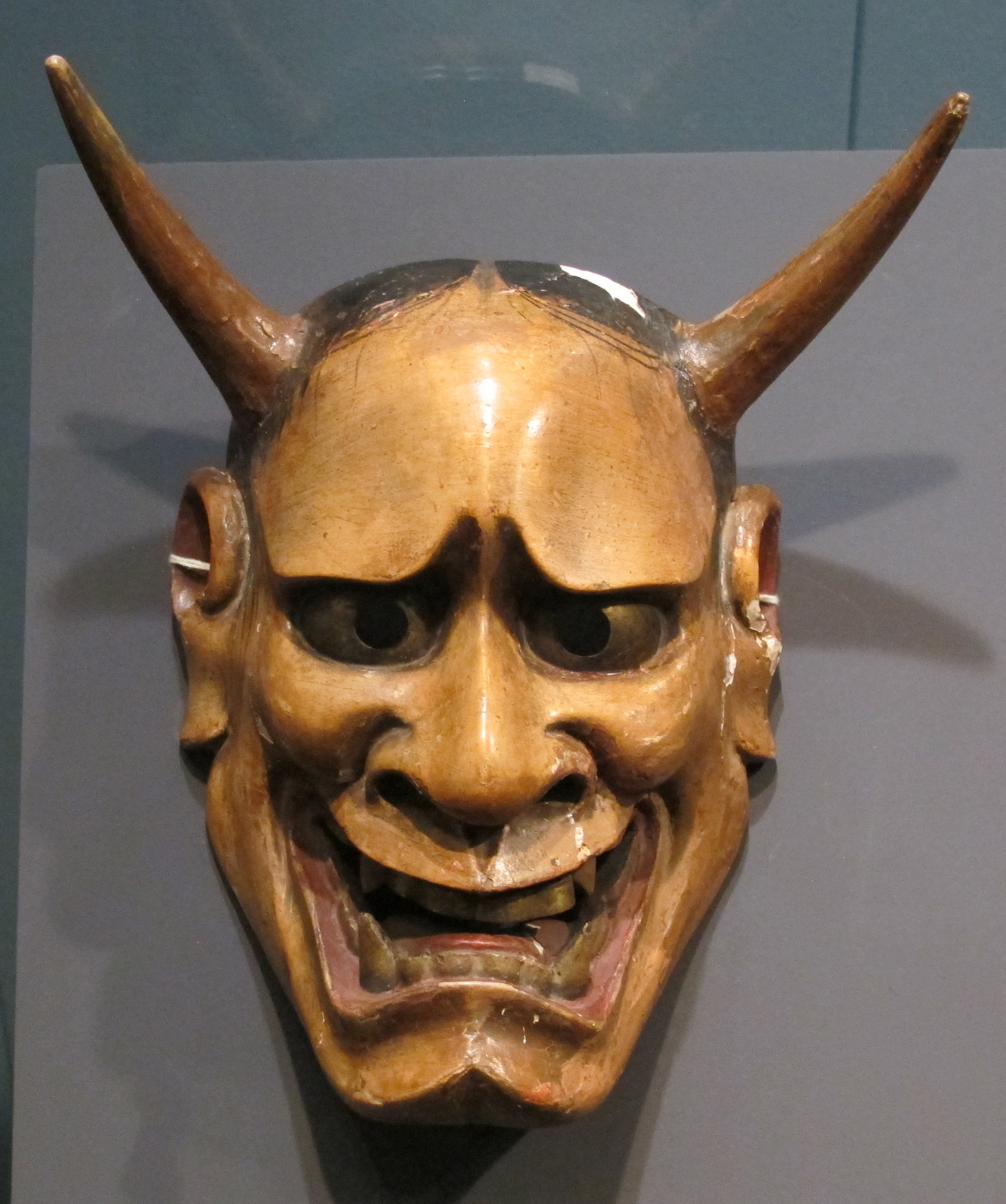
Japanese wooden mask depicting demon

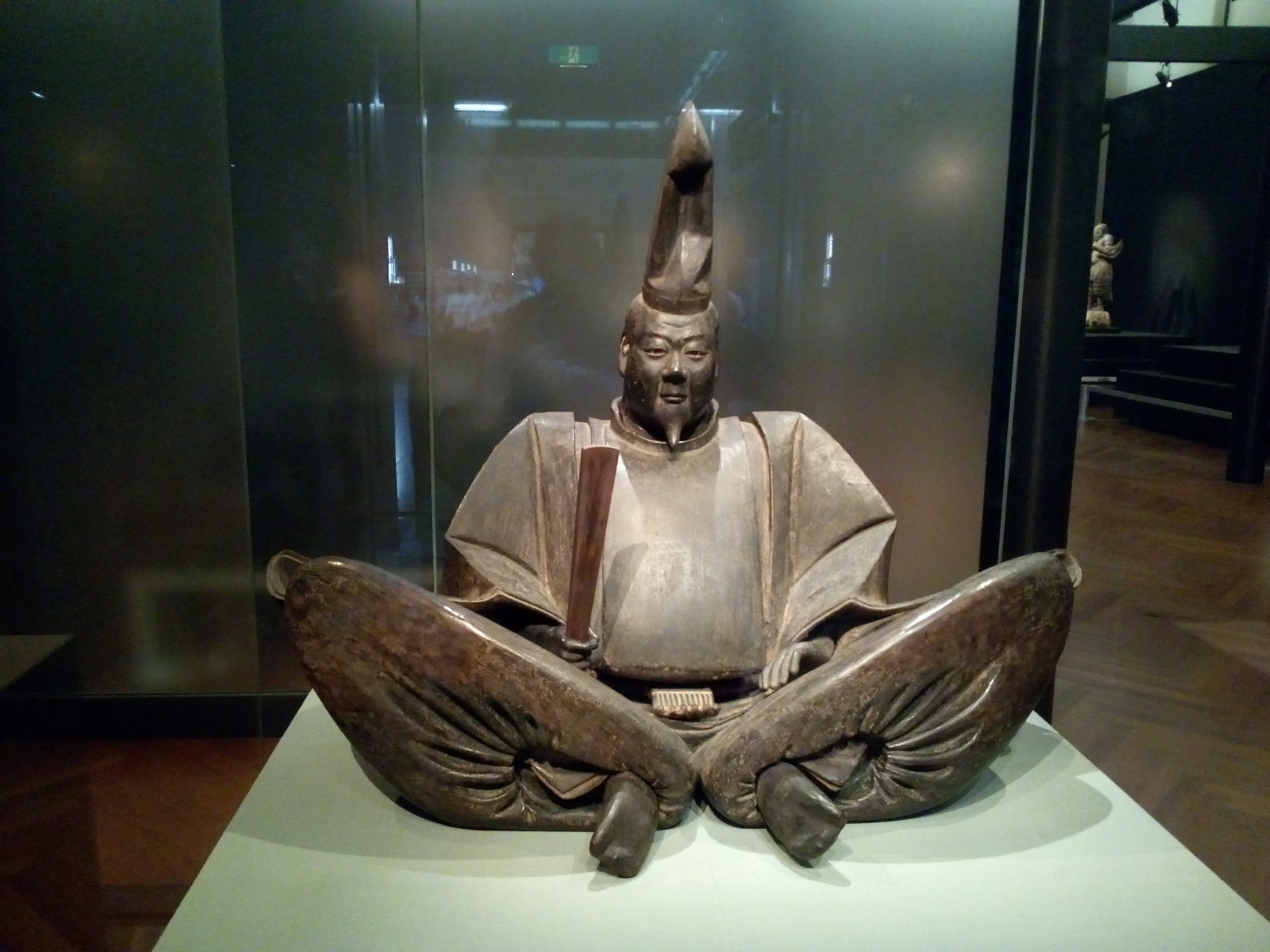
Wooden portrait of Minamoto no Yoritomo, 13–14th century

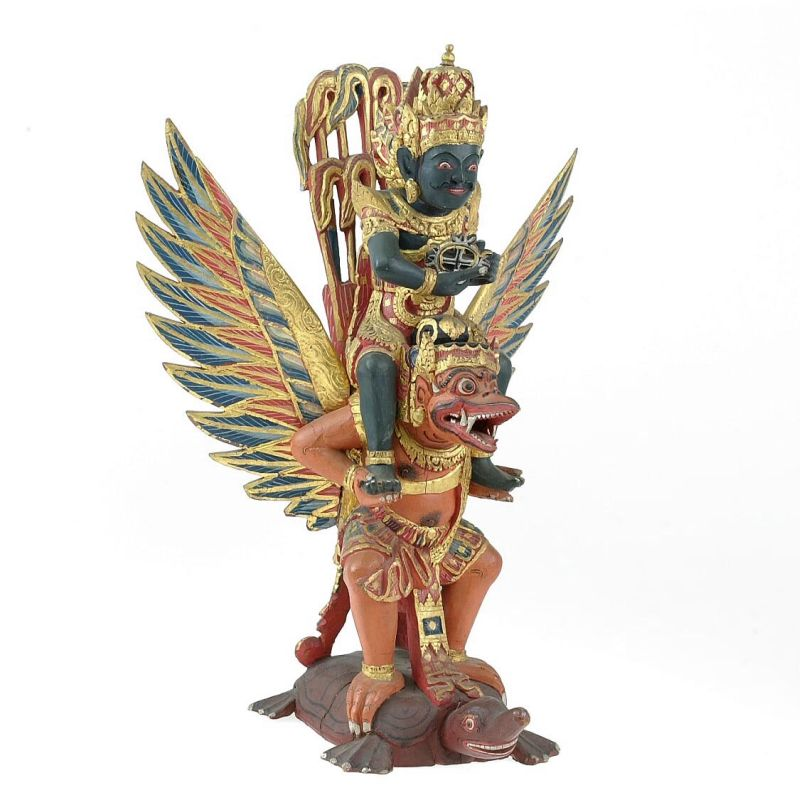
Balinese wood carving from Indonesia, depicting Vishnu mounting Garuda

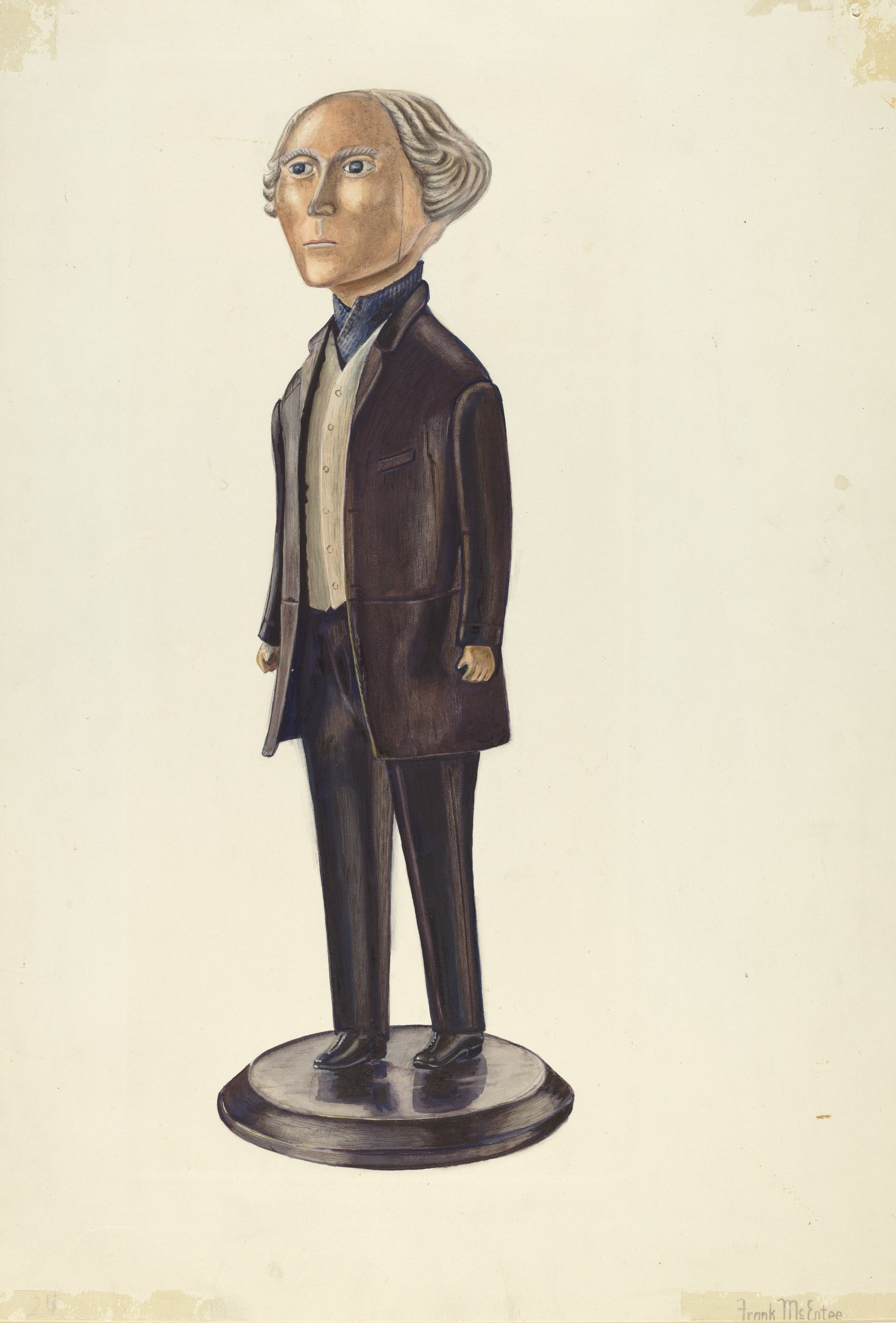
Federal Art Project, Frank McEntee, artist, watercolor

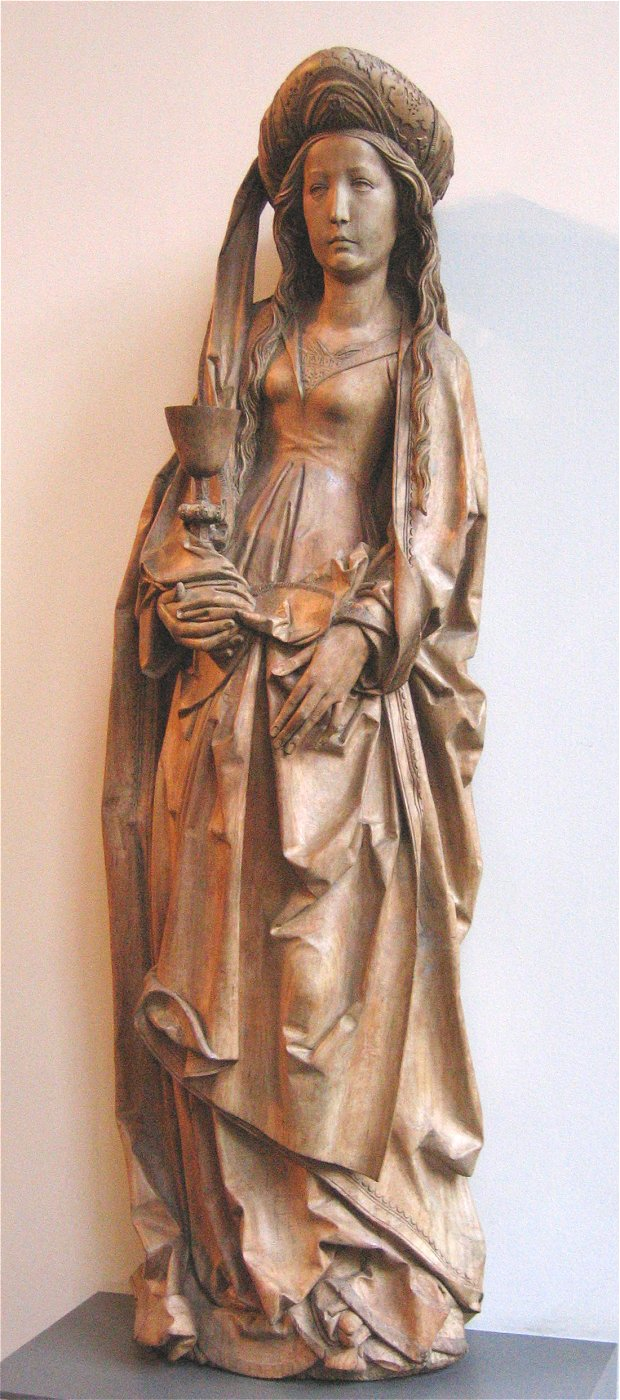
Tilman Riemenschneider's Saint Barbara from Germany

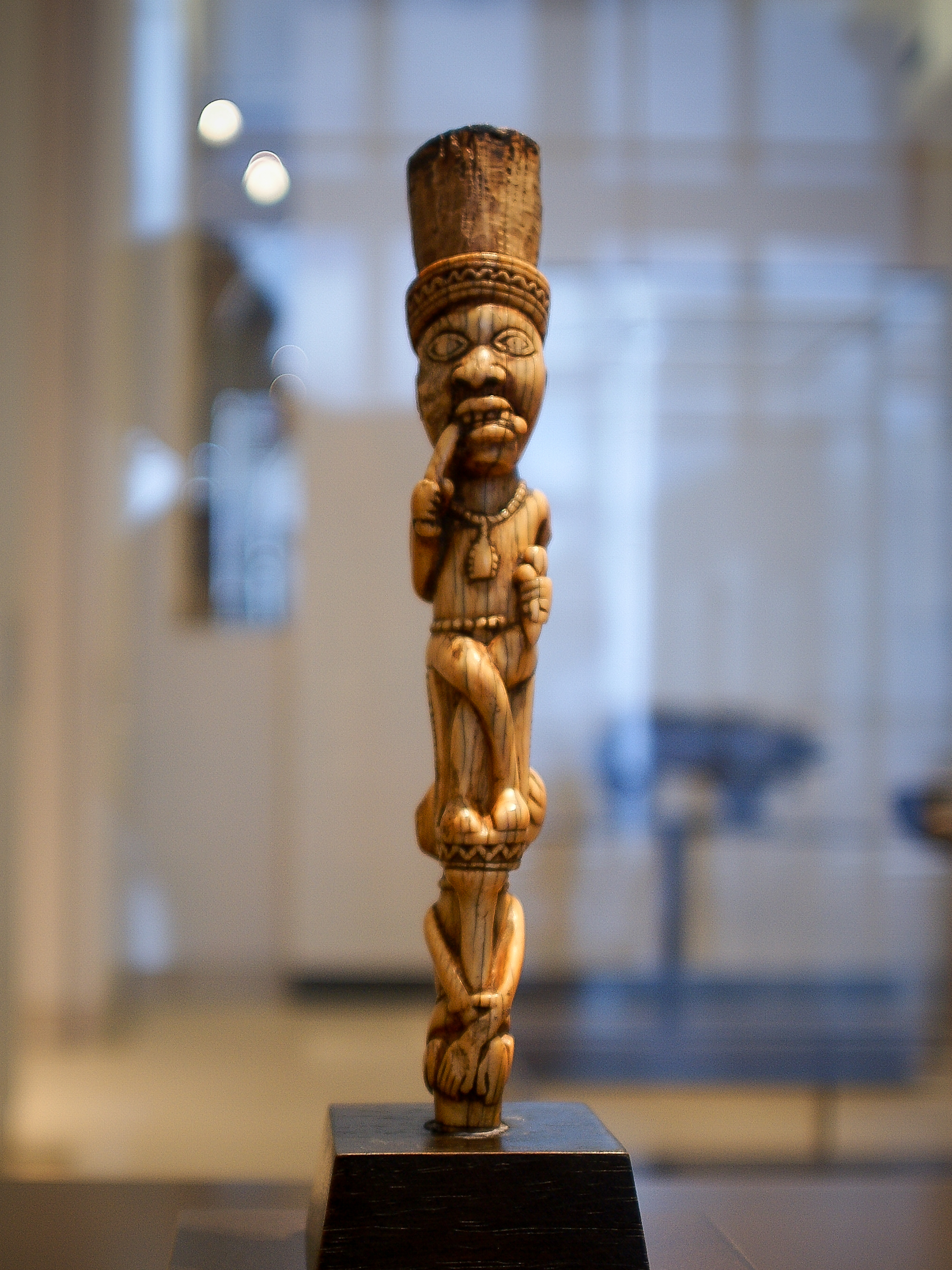
Yombe-sculpture, 19th century

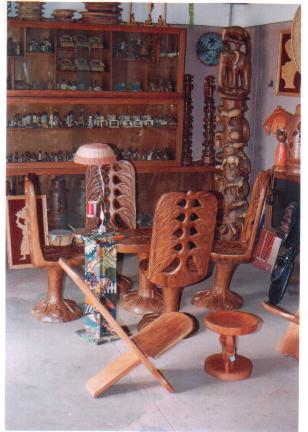
in Festac Town, Lagos, Nigeria

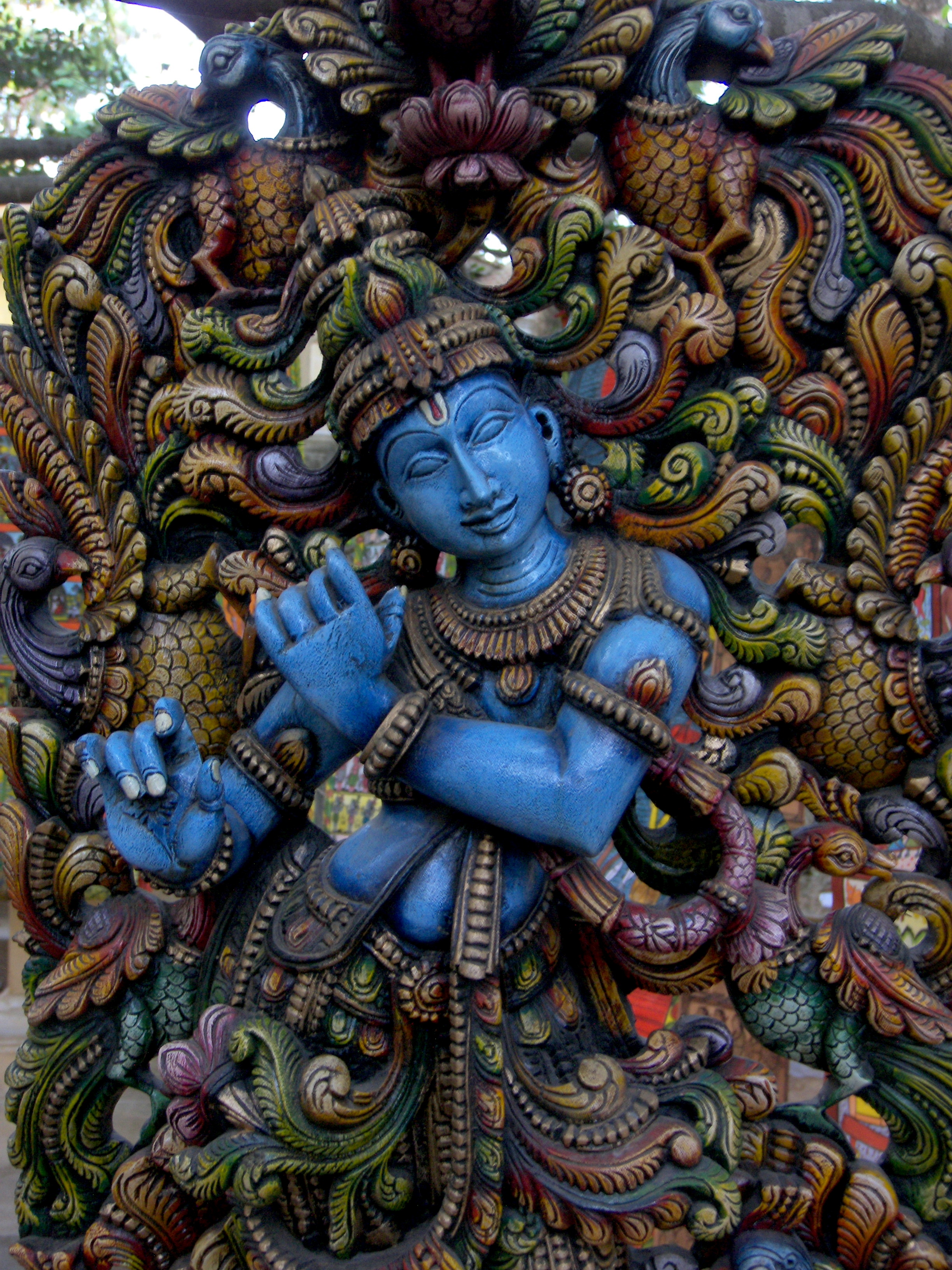
Wooden Krishna, India

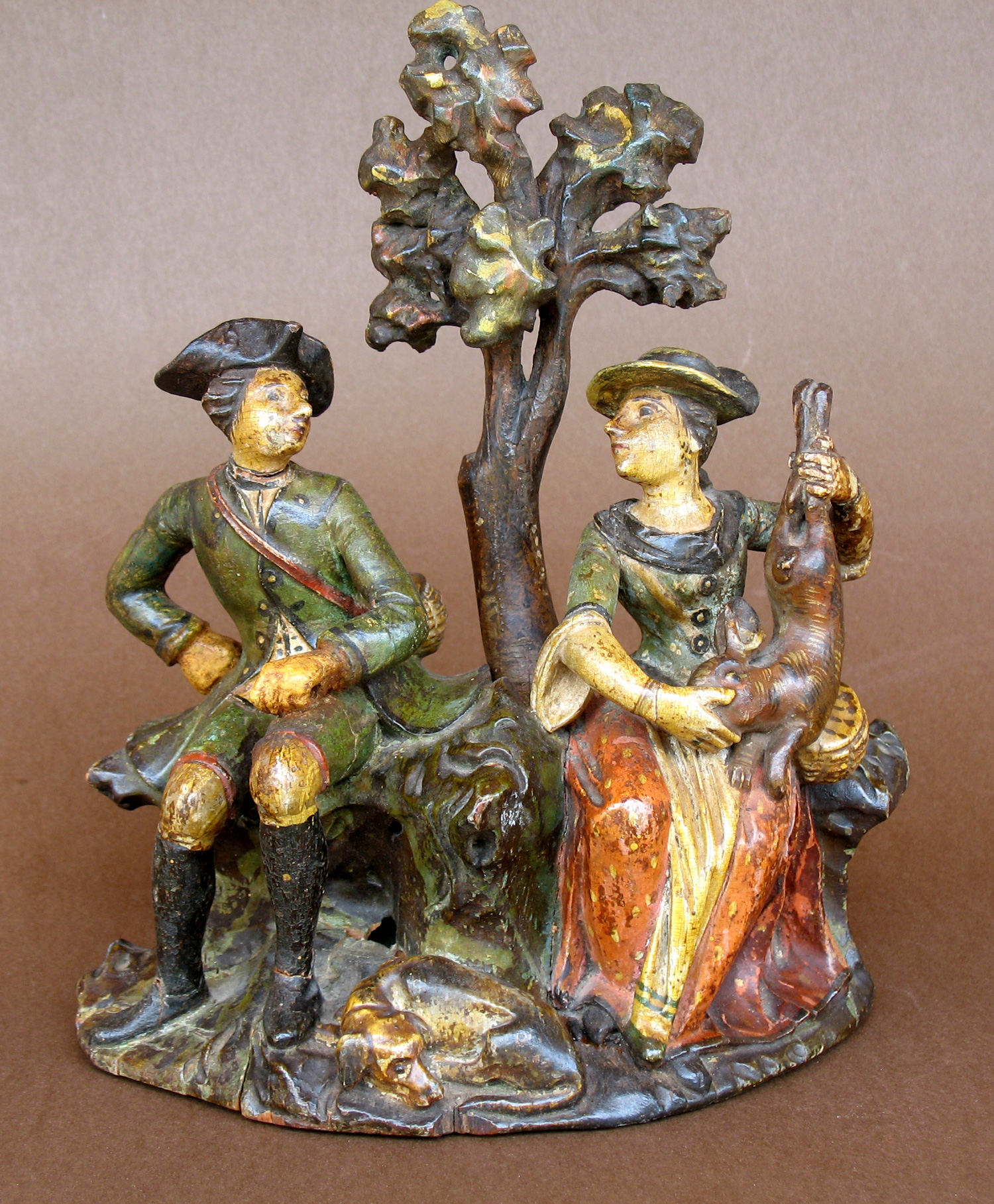
Carved gallant genre scene with figurines from Val Gardena, 18th century

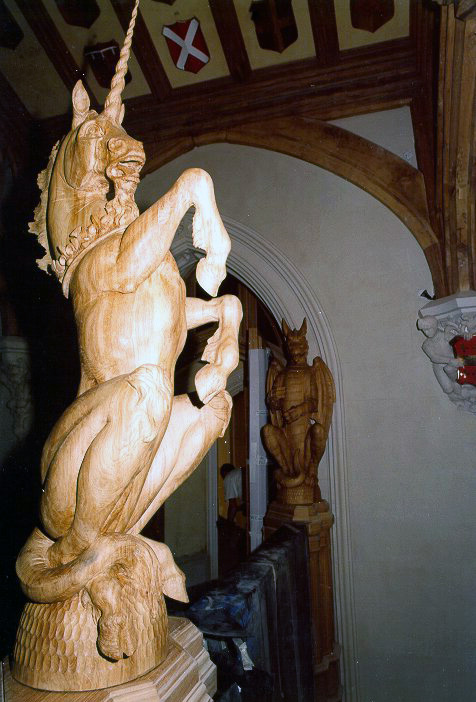
Carving of a unicorn by G&H Studios, Somerset, England

c. 1940s, hobo by Carl Johan Trygg

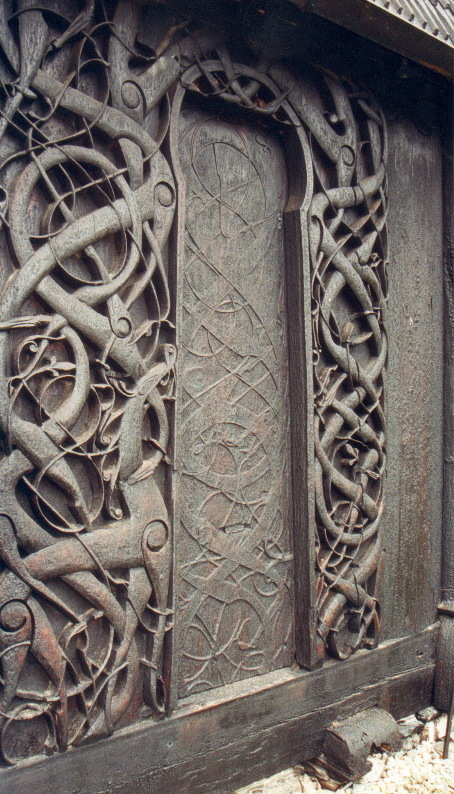
Carving on the Urnes stave church, an example of the Urnes style, Norway

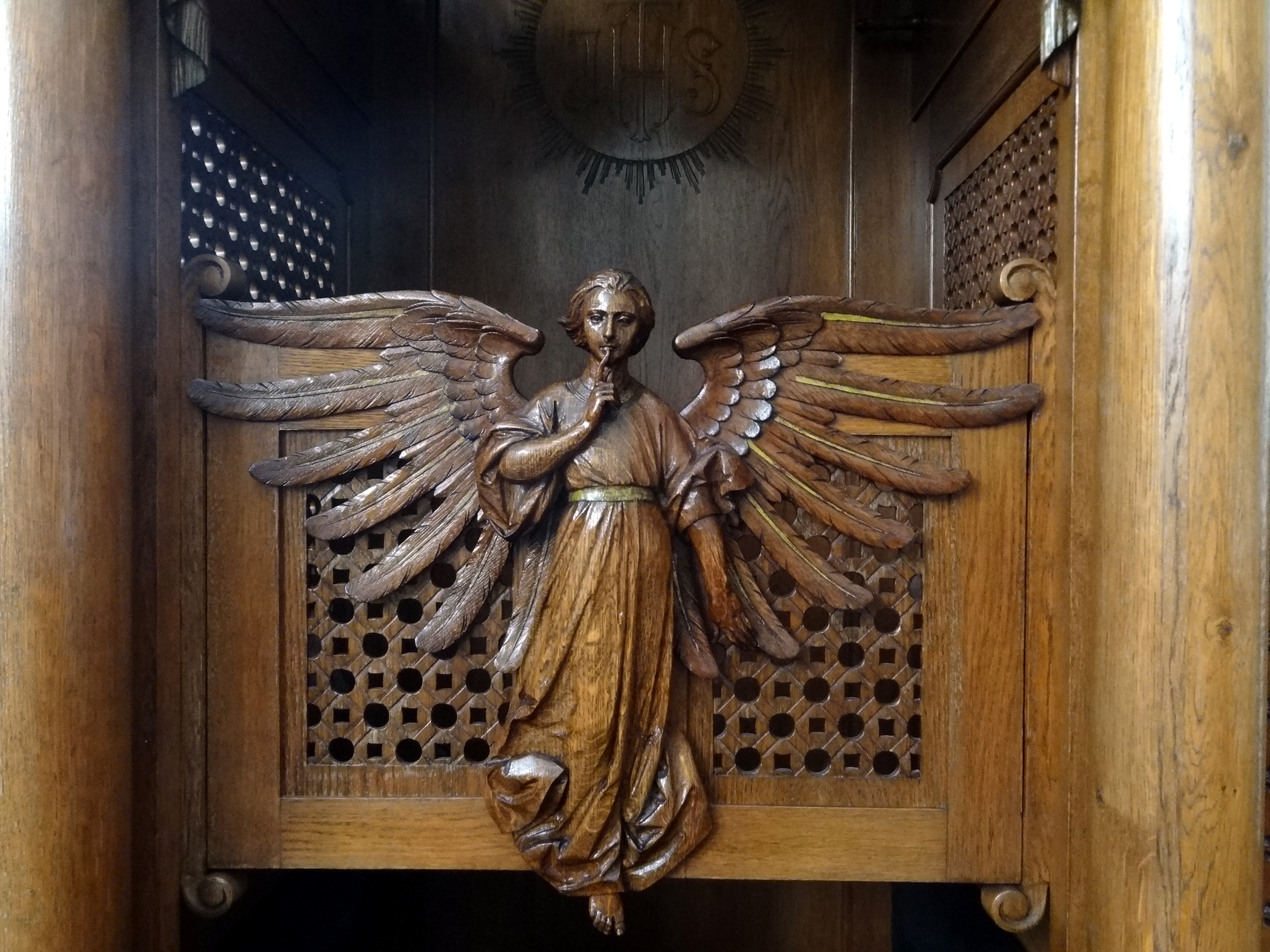
An angel on the front part of a confessional in a church as a metaphor of the seal of confession, Poland

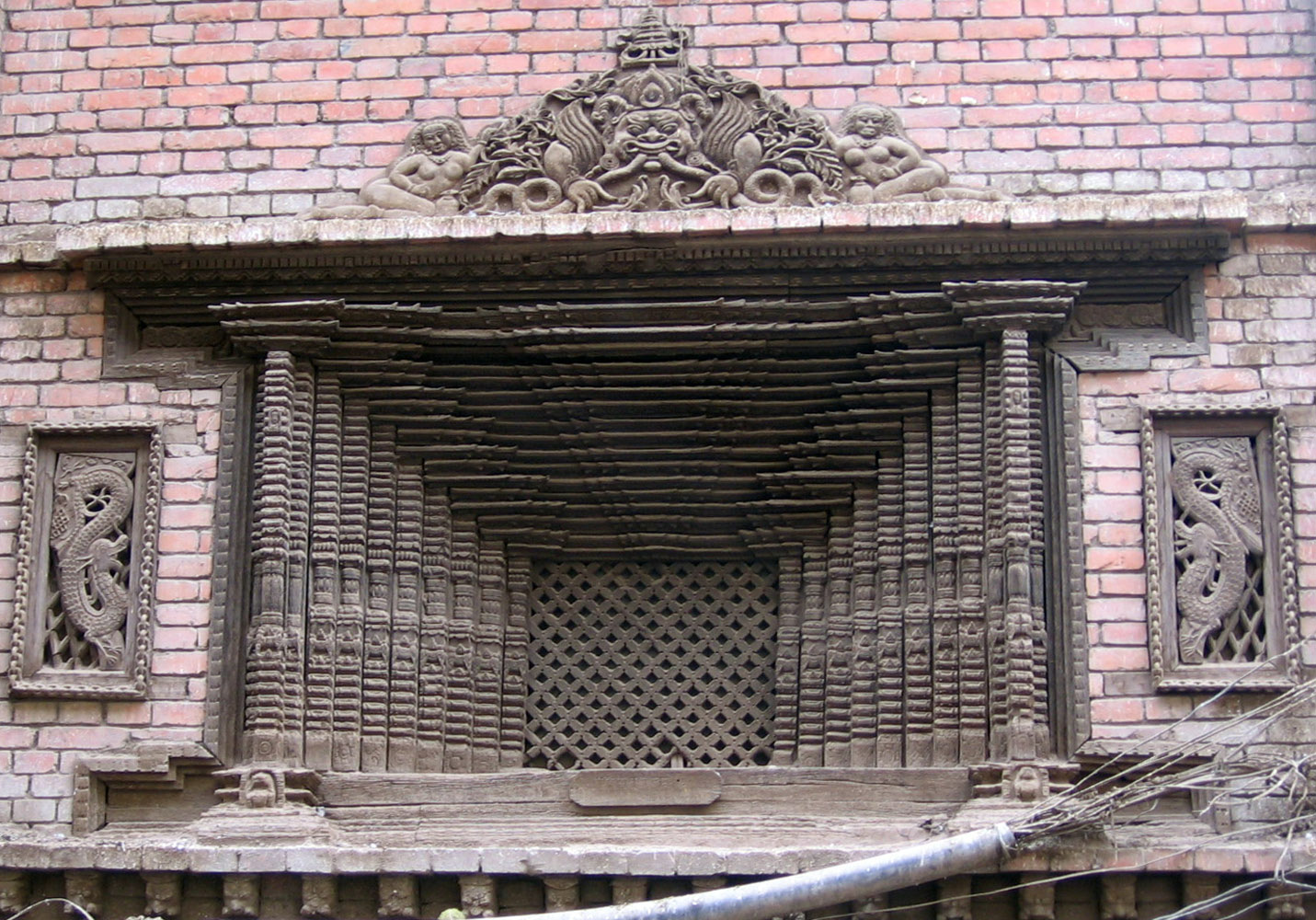
Desay Madu Jhya (window) in Kathmandu, Nepal

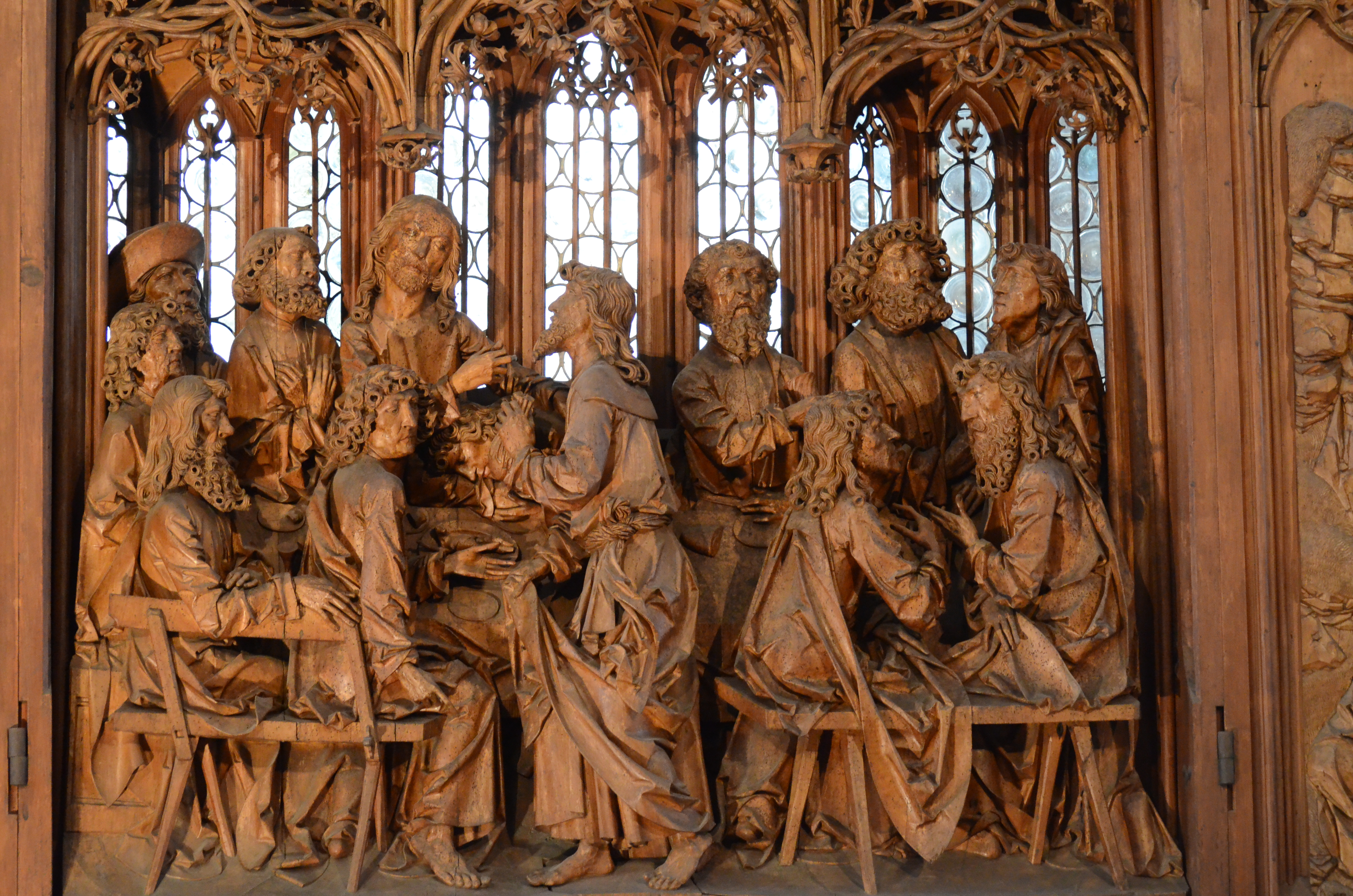
Detail of the Last Supper from Tilman Riemenschneider's Altar of the Holy Blood, 1501–05, Rothenburg ob der Tauber, Germany

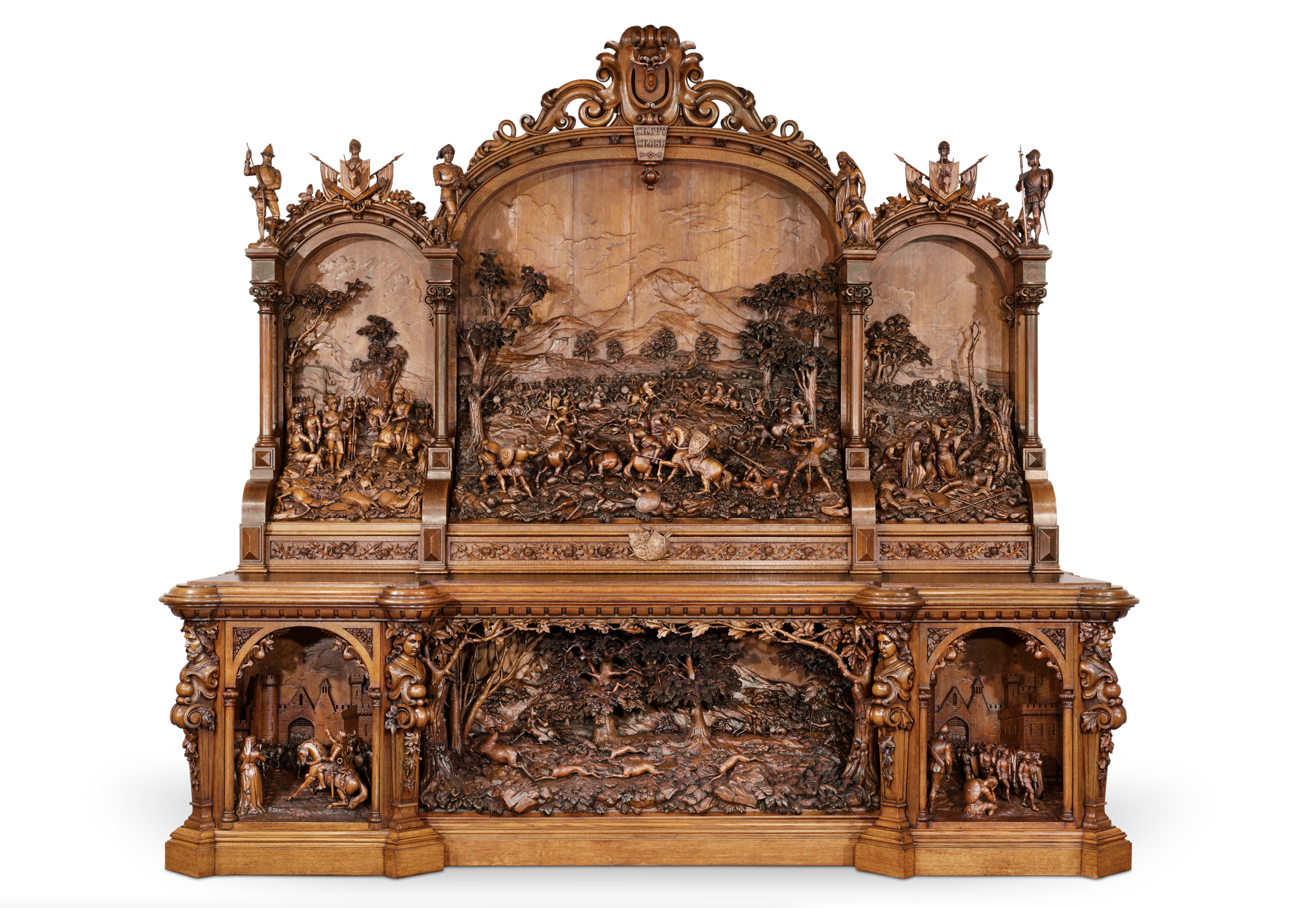
The Chevy Chase Sideboard by Gerrard Robinson, an icon of Victorian furniture

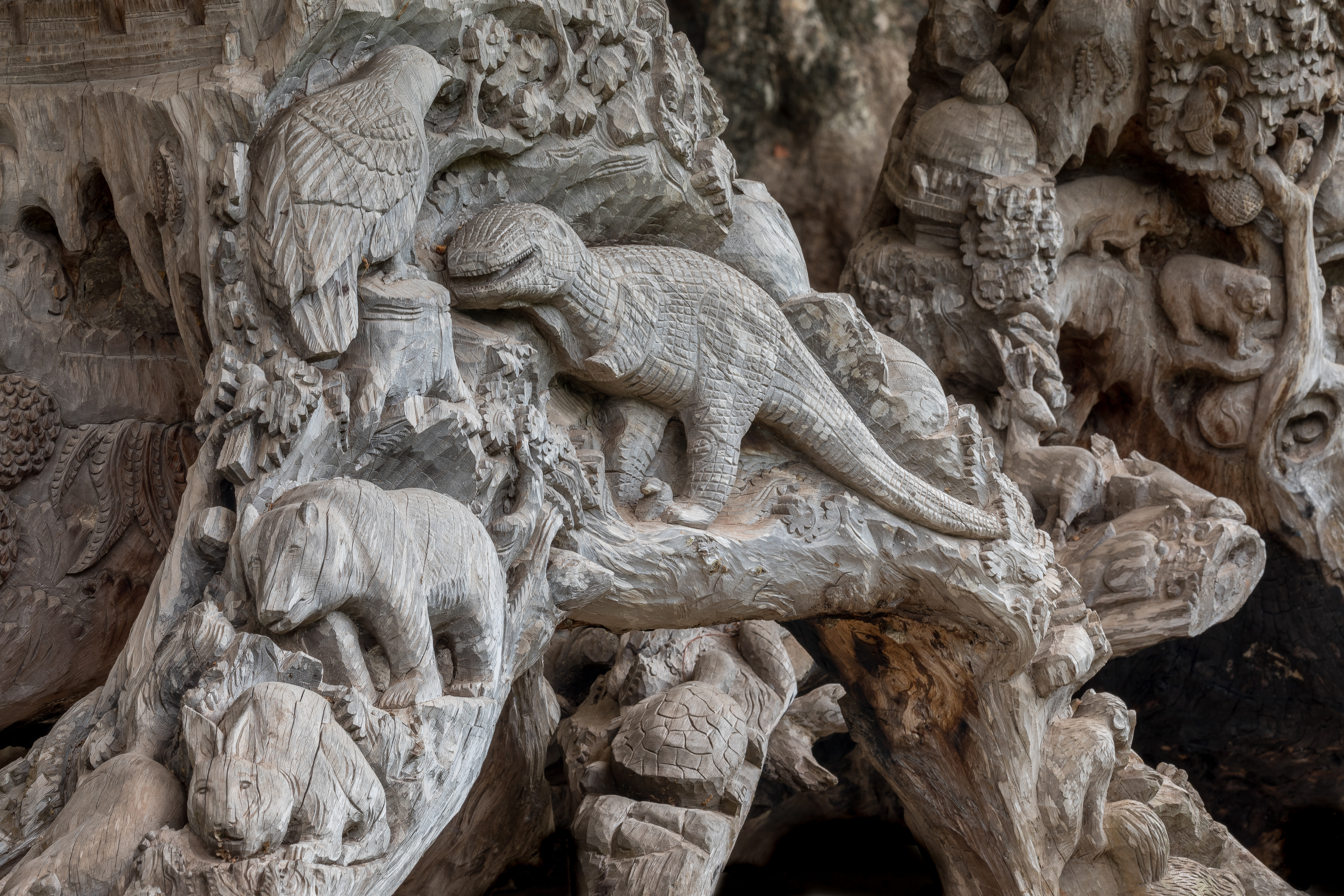
Carved tree with reliefs of dinosaur and other animals, Laos

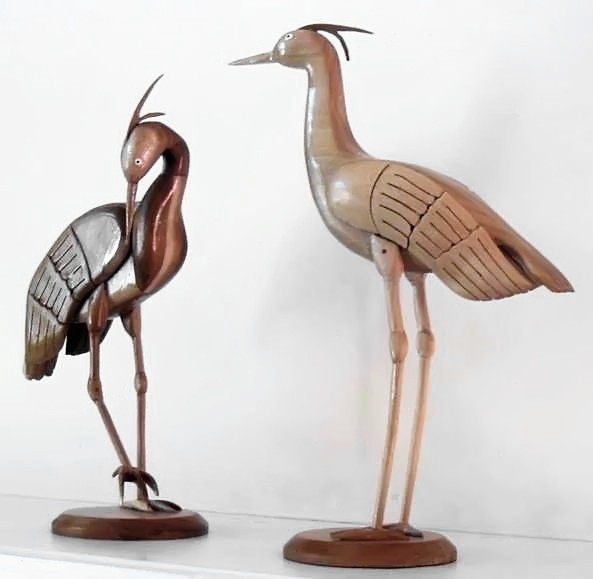
Carved wooden cranes

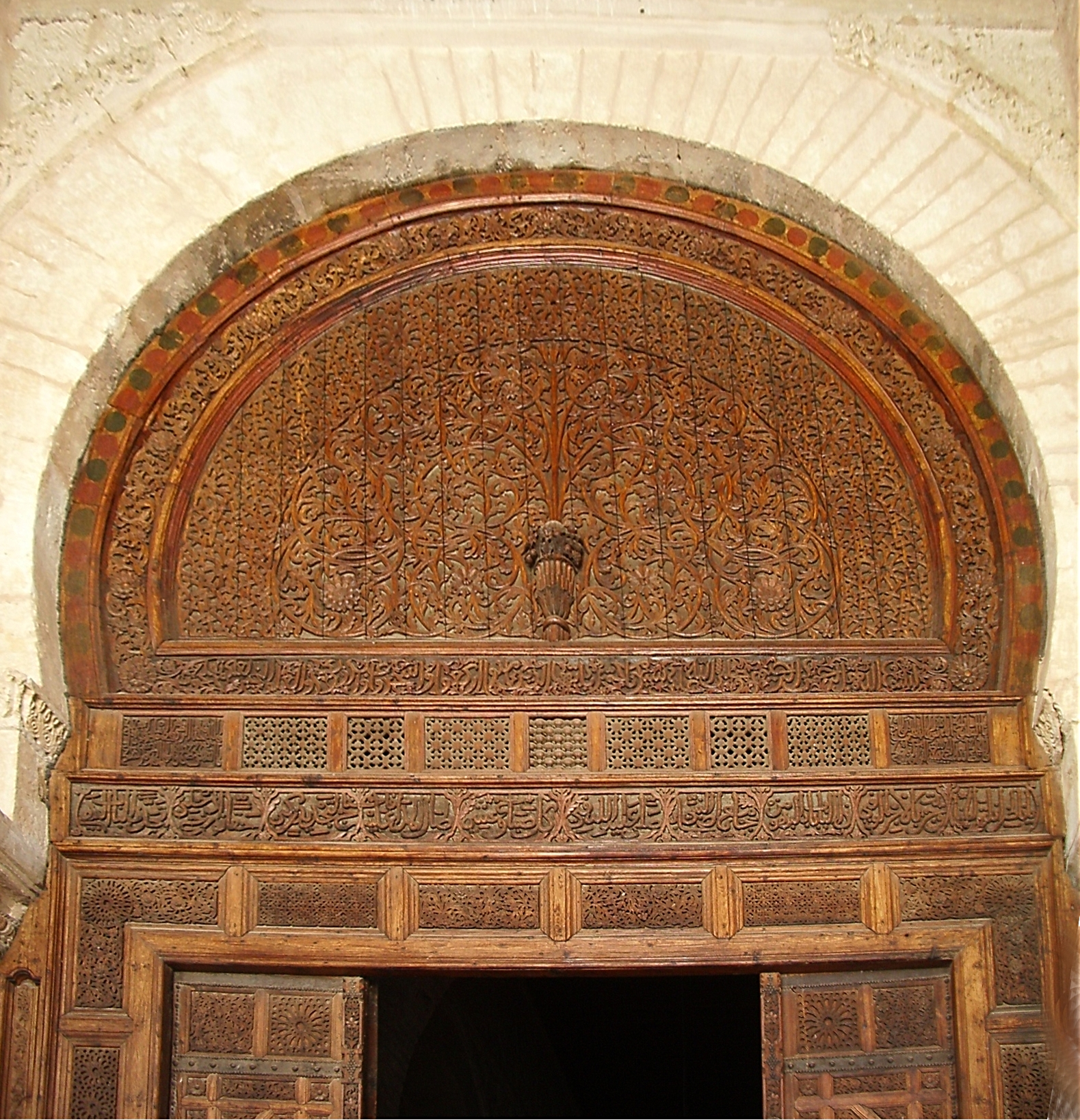
Finely carved wooden door in the Great Mosque of Kairouan, Tunisia

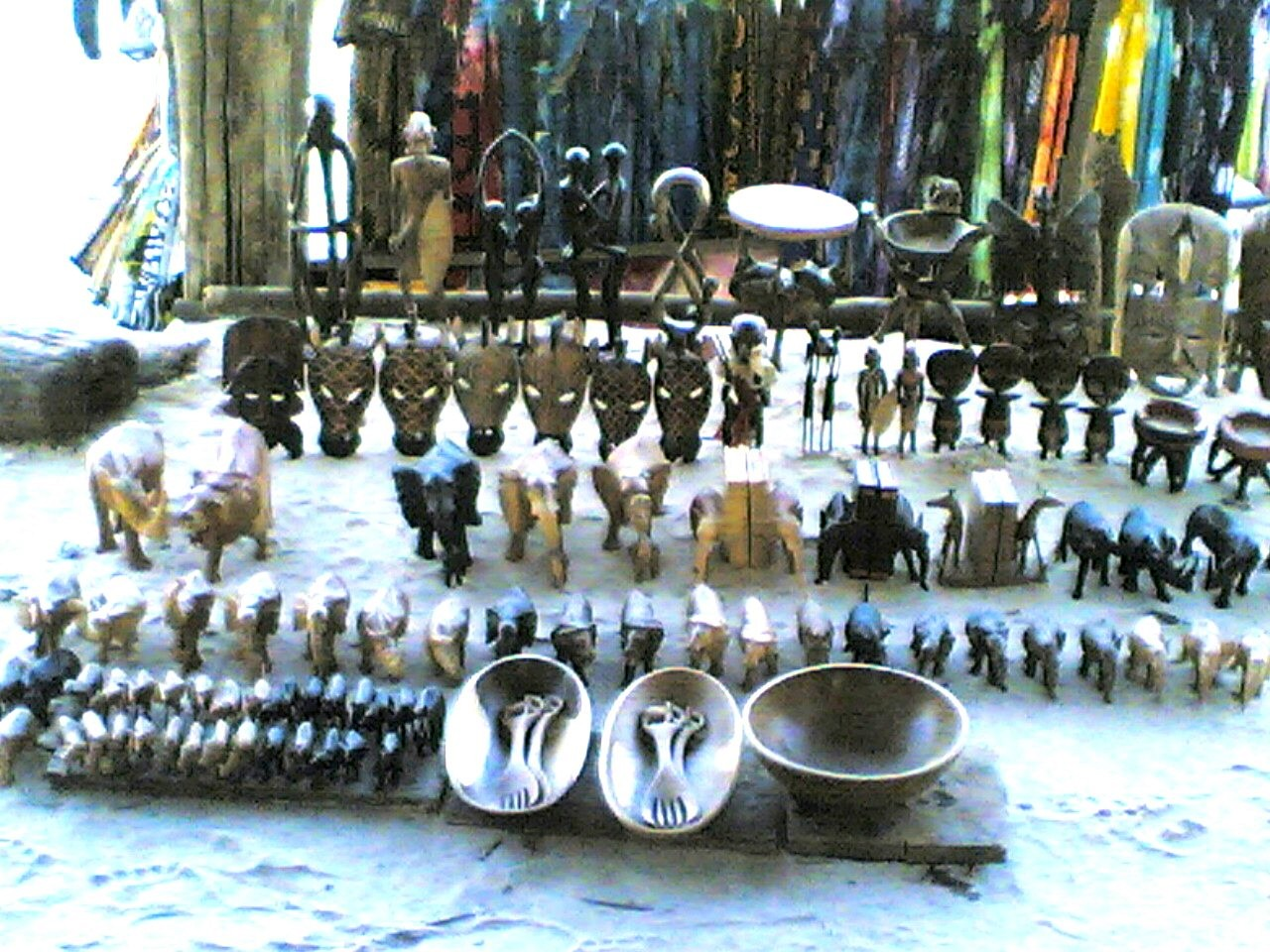
Carvings for sale at Mombasa beach, Kenya

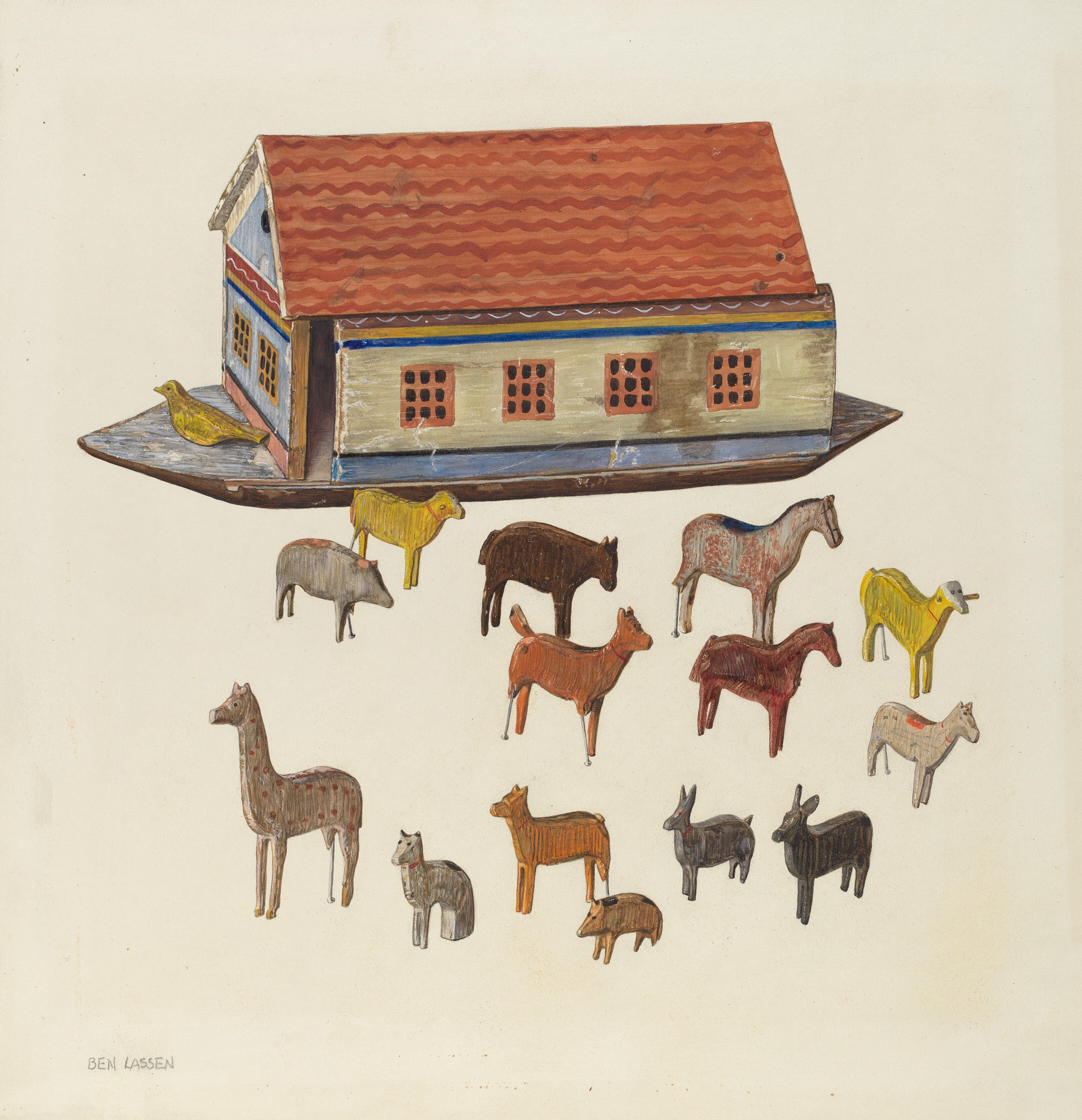
Noah's Ark with animals-Sunday toy- Index of American Design Federal Art Project

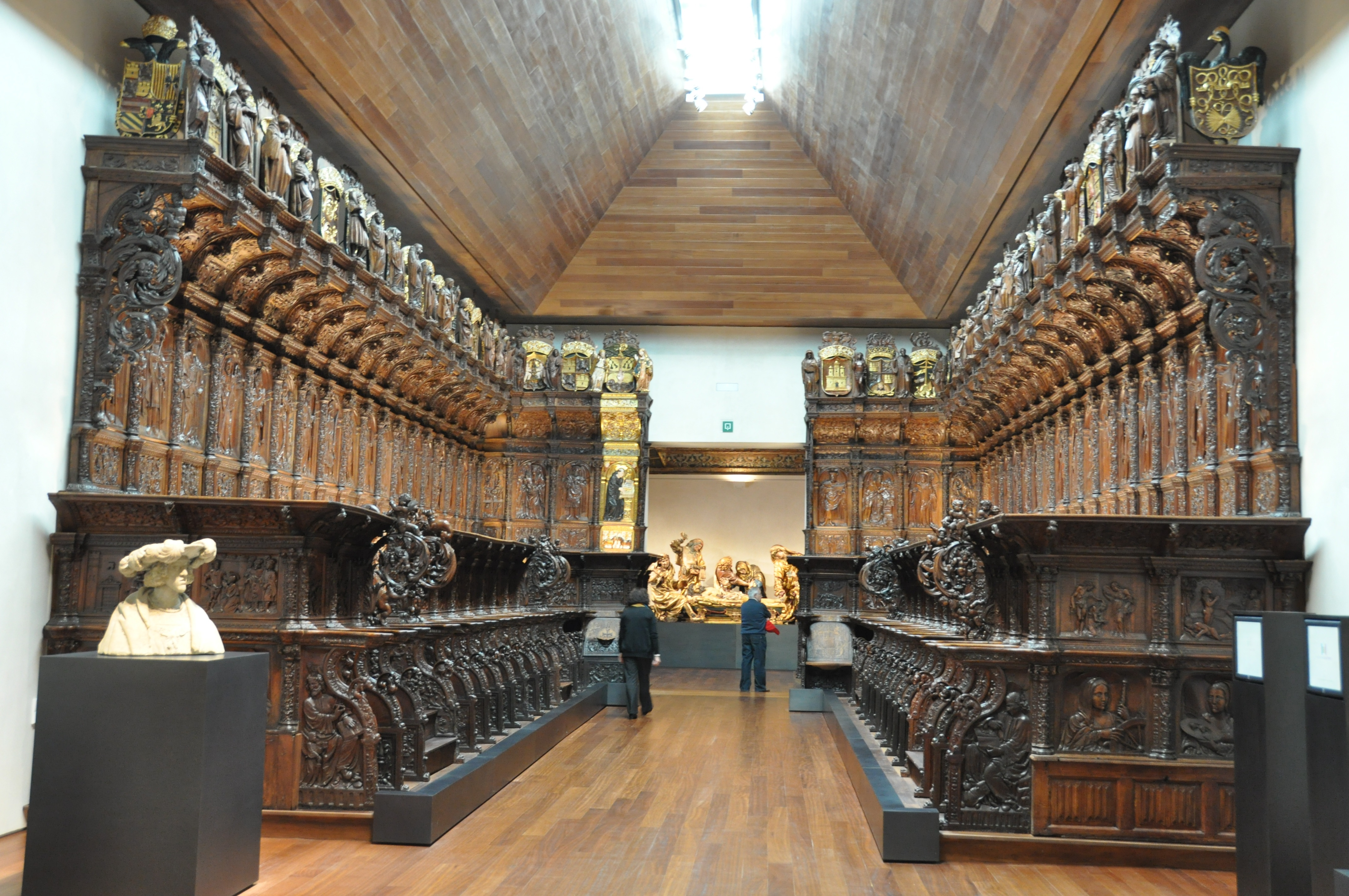
Old choir stalls. National Sculpture Museum in Valladolid

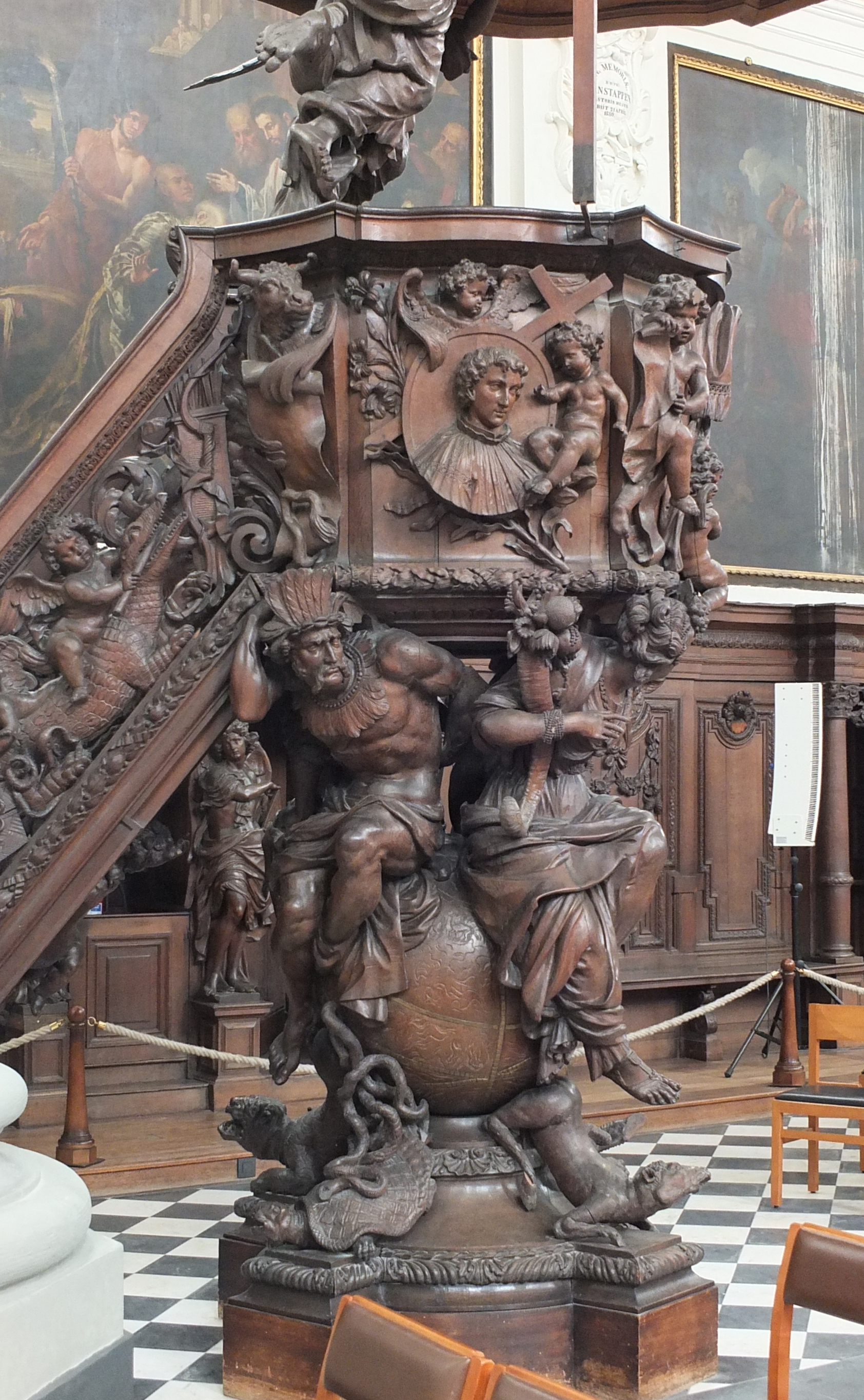
Pulpit in Church of St Peter and St Paul in Mechelen, Belgium

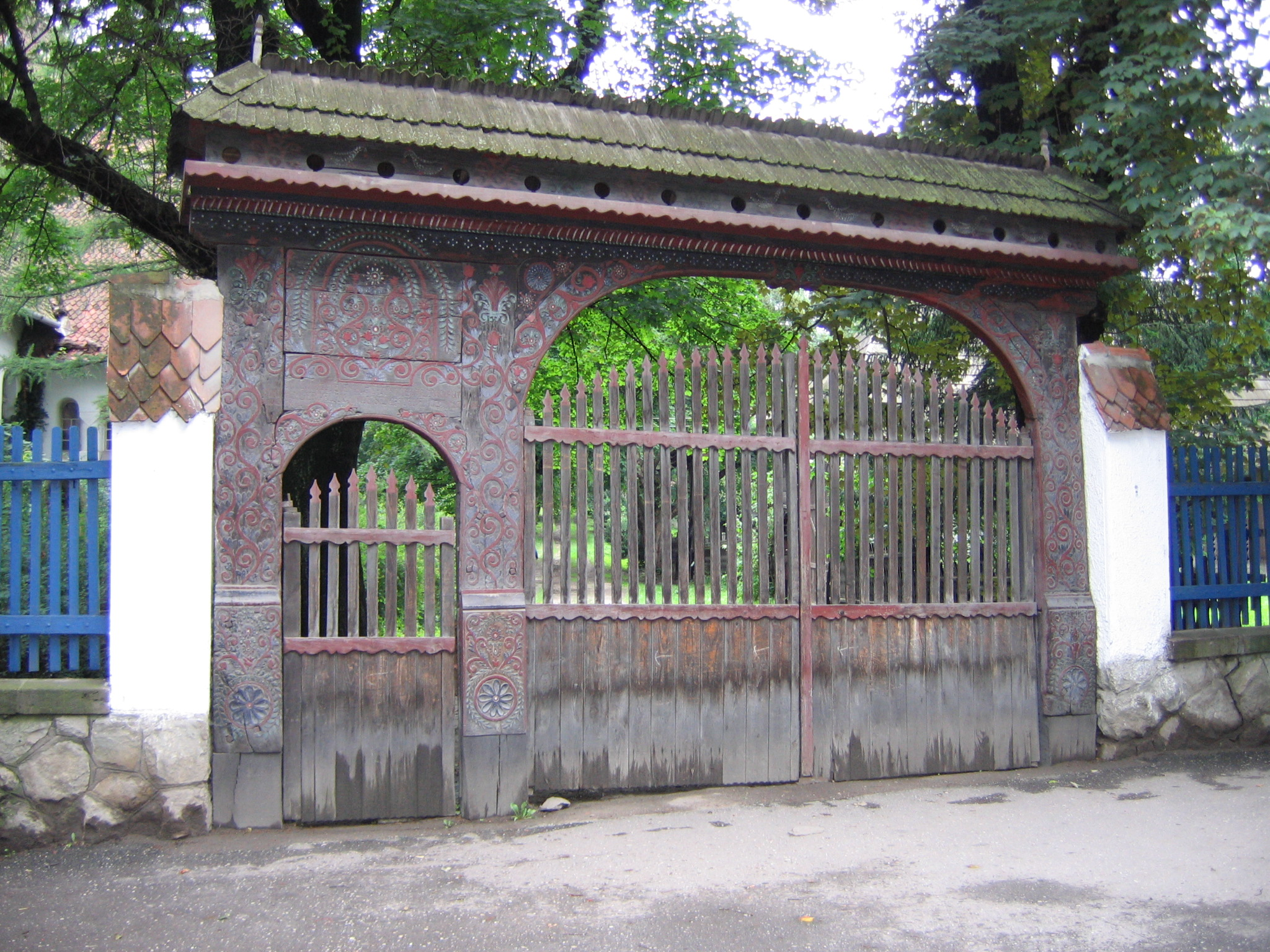
A Székely gate in front of the Székely National Museum, in Sfântu Gheorghe, Romania

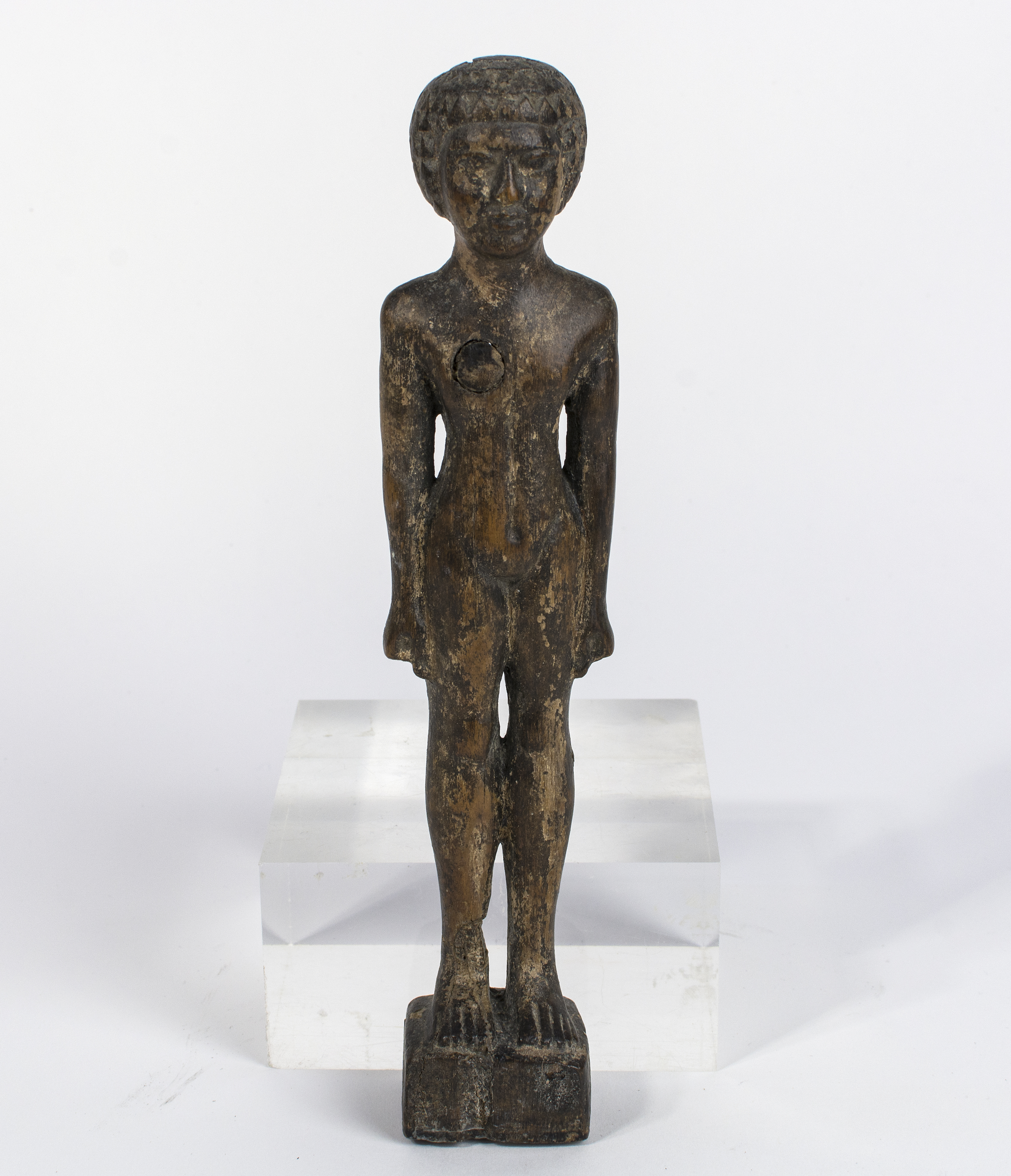
Wooden Female Figure from the Hunt Museum collection.

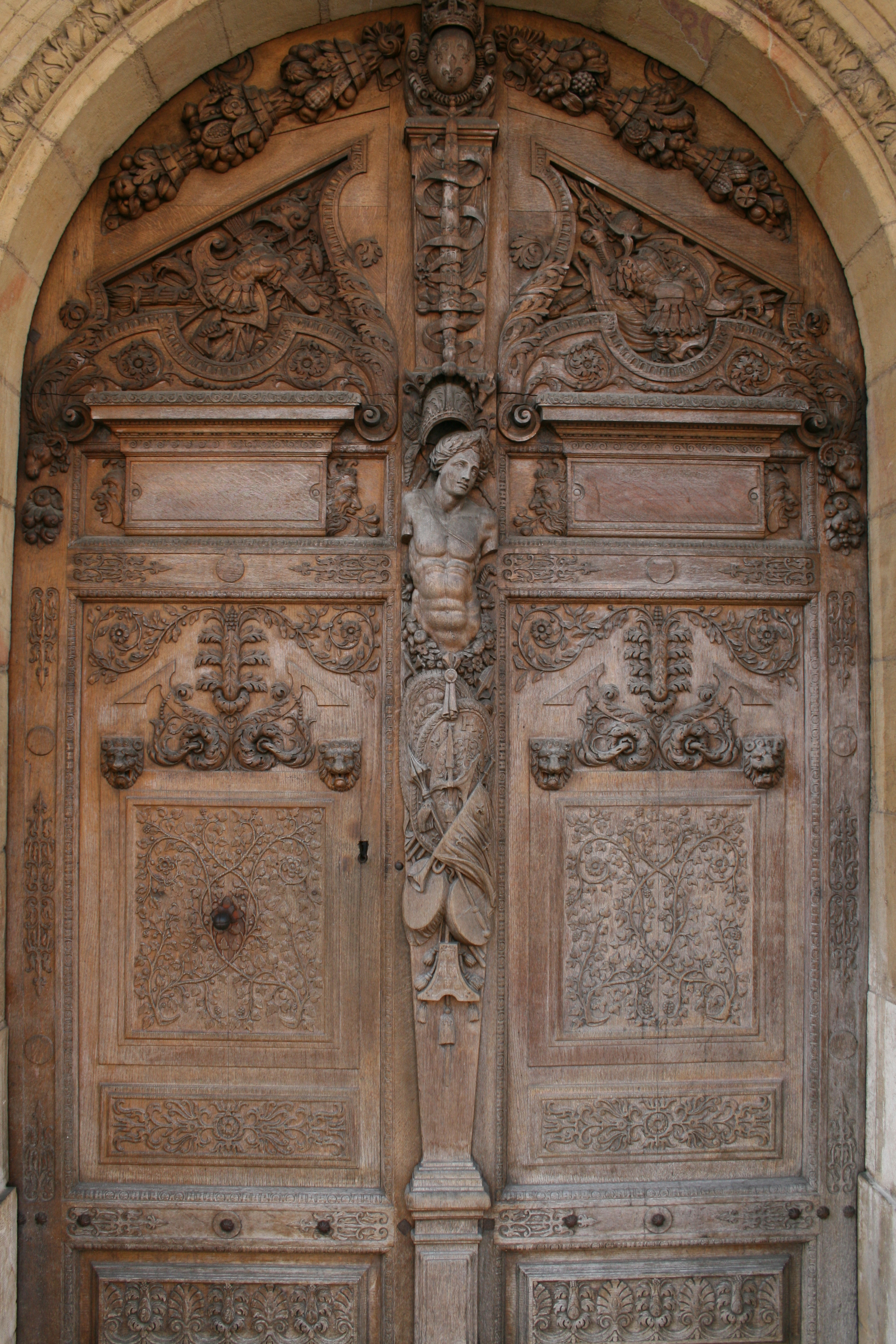
Porte Hugues Sambin, door of the old Parliament of Burgundy and the current court of appeal of Dijon (Côte-d'Or, France)

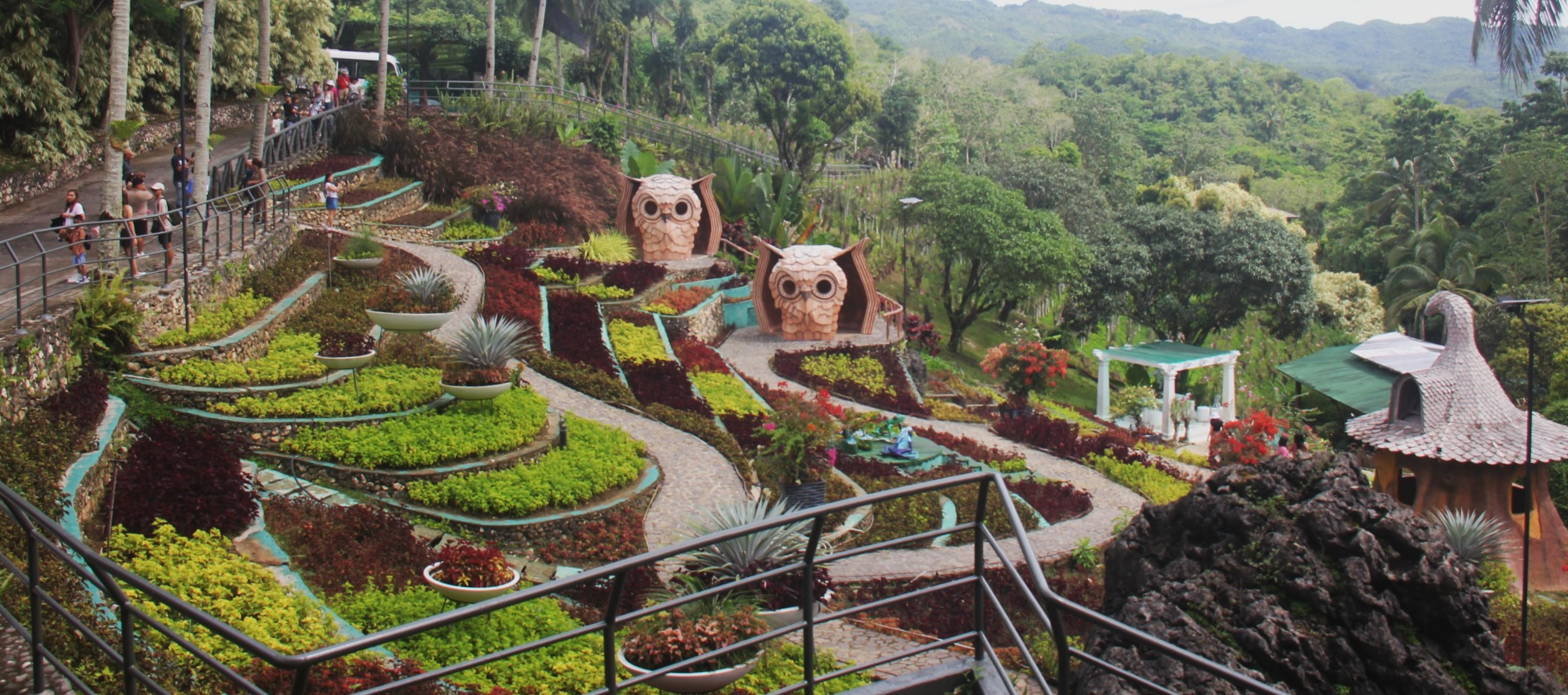
Two wooden owl sculptures located at the Cebu Safari and Adventure Park, Philippines

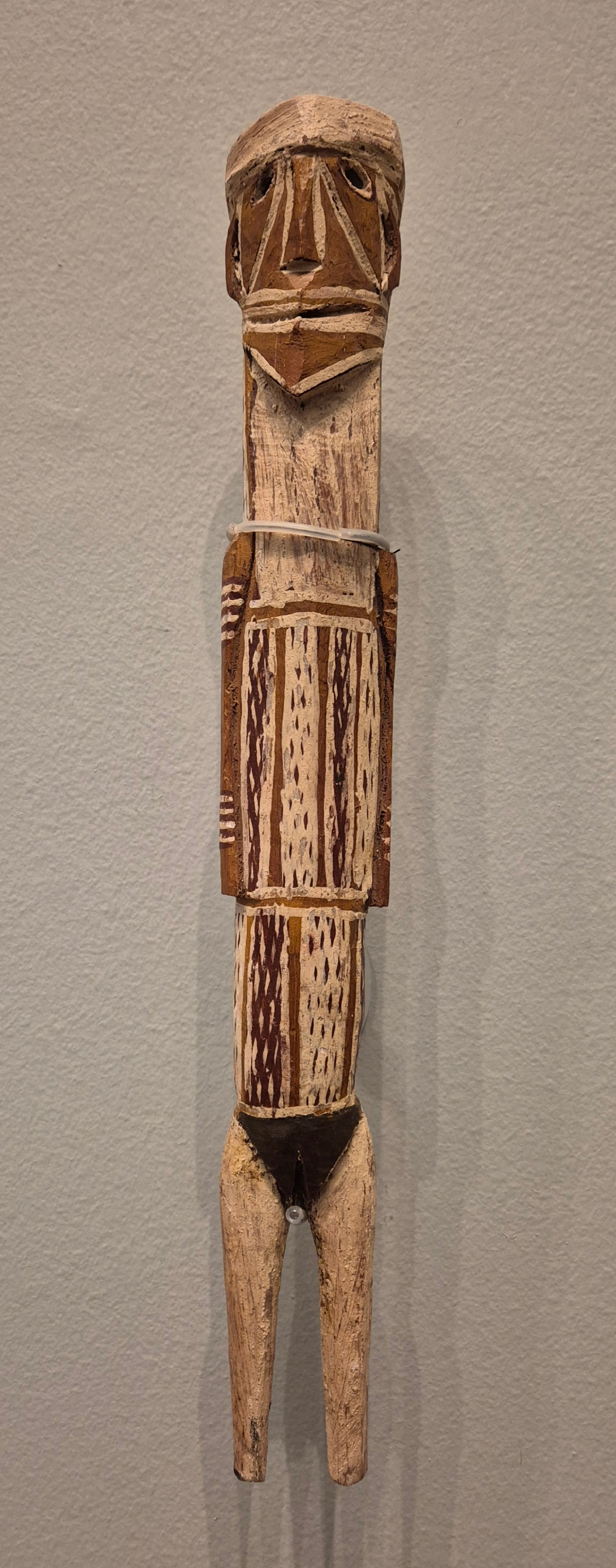
"Gumurrwaymi" (The woman of Bremer Island), by Aboriginal Australian artist Mawalan Marika (1952)

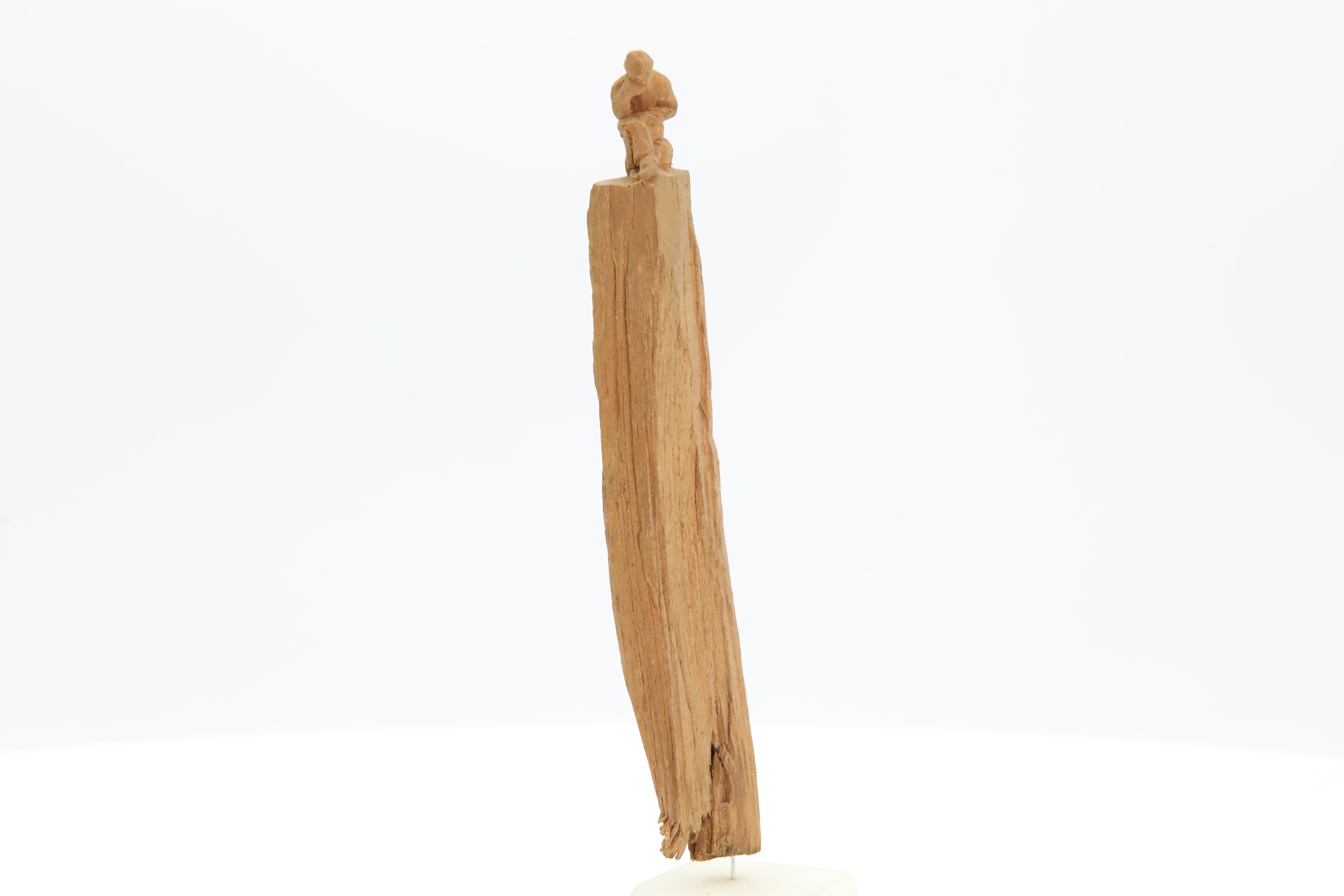
Very small sculpture by Austrian artist Ottmar Zeiller.

== See also ==
- List of woodcarvers
- Chainsaw carving
- History of wood carving
- Woodcut
- Woodturning
- Woodworking
- Wood carving in the Marquesas Islands
- Woodcarved Catholic saints in the Parish Church of Ortisei, northern Italy
- National Wood Carvers Association
- Woodcarving events:
  - Woodfest Wales
- Arborglyph, carvings made in the bark of living trees
