= Wood carving in the Marquesas Islands =

Local craft

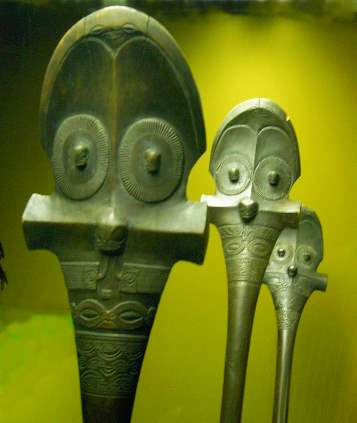
Wood carvings

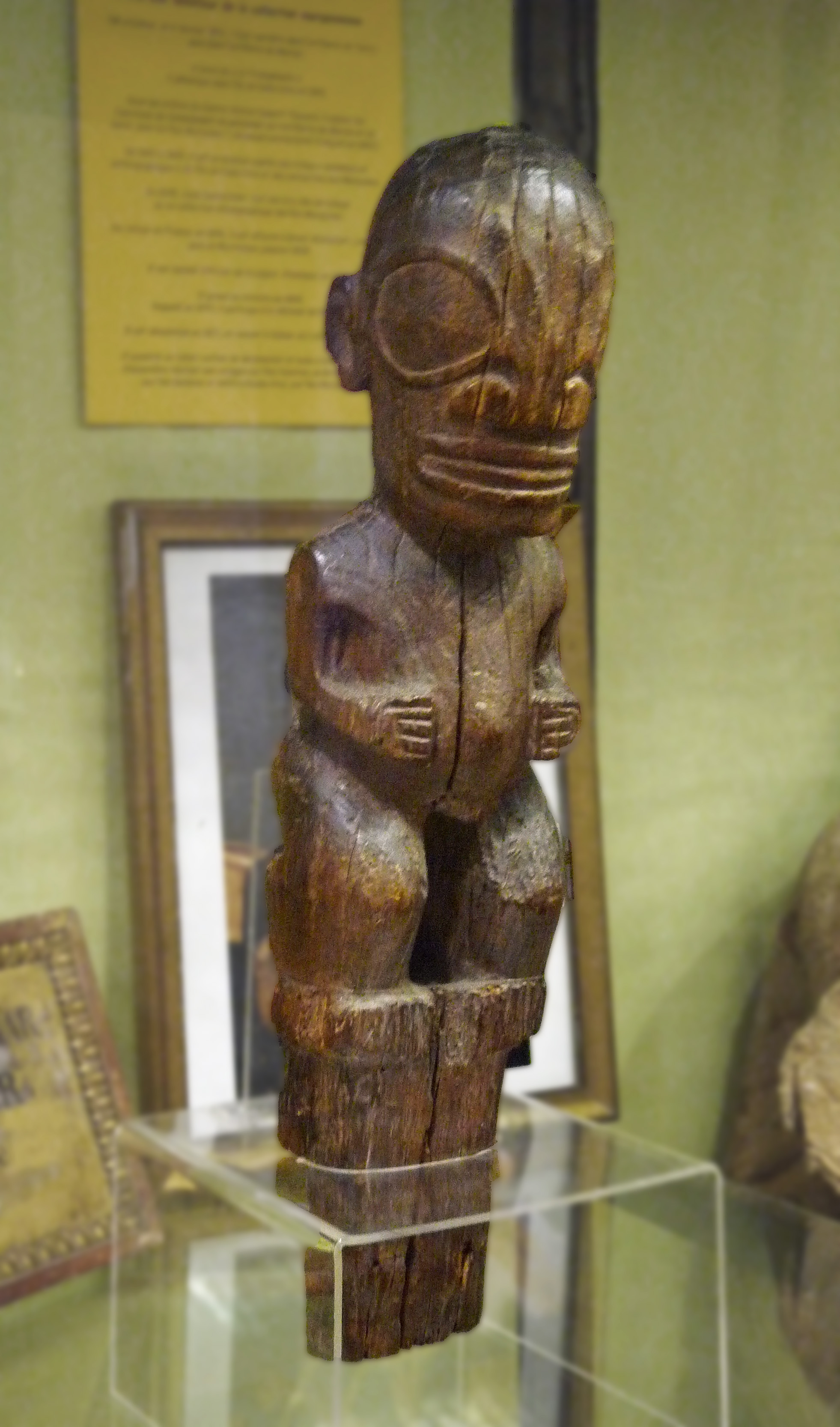
Tiki

Wood carving in the Marquesas Islands is a practice undertaken by many of the local master craftsmen, who are known as tuhuna. The tuhuna are not only adept at wood carving, but are also skilled at tattoo art and adze manufacture. Marquesan wooden crafts are considered among the finest in French Polynesia; they are highly sought after, and of consistently high quality, although weaving, basket-making, and pareu painting is more popular, especially among women artisans. Paul Gauguin noted the artistic sense of decoration of the Marquesas and appreciated the "unheard of sense of decoration" in their creative art forms.

== History ==
Wooden figures from Marquesan prehistory can reveal much about the early practices of the local peoples. The popularity of Marquesan wood carving was due to its increasing demand in foreign countries. This was also a consequence of the introduction of imported metal carving tools in the late 19th century. As a result, new styles emerged in wood carving such as decorating the full surface of an artefact with low-relief designs which had similarities to tattoo designs. This was done to meet the growing demand for souvenirs in the late 19th century.

== Wood cultivation ==
Material used to make artifacts includes Oceania rosewood (Miro or Mi'o), oceania walnut (tou), iron wood (aito), the coconut tree (tumu ha'ari or tumu'ehi) as well as Pacific rosewood (Thespesia populnea) and temana (Calophyllum inophyllum); iron wood (Casuarina equisetifolia) is used to carve war clubs and other artifacts. Sandalwood was cleared out of the Marquesas between 1814 and 1817. It is important to the Marquesan people to use wood from the islands, because of its quality and it follows the tradition of their ancestors. Typically, the wood is dried for up for 10 years, and then treated against pests. While some craftsmen cultivate trees in their own gardens for their wood products, they also purchase it from vendors who grow it in the valleys.

== Products ==
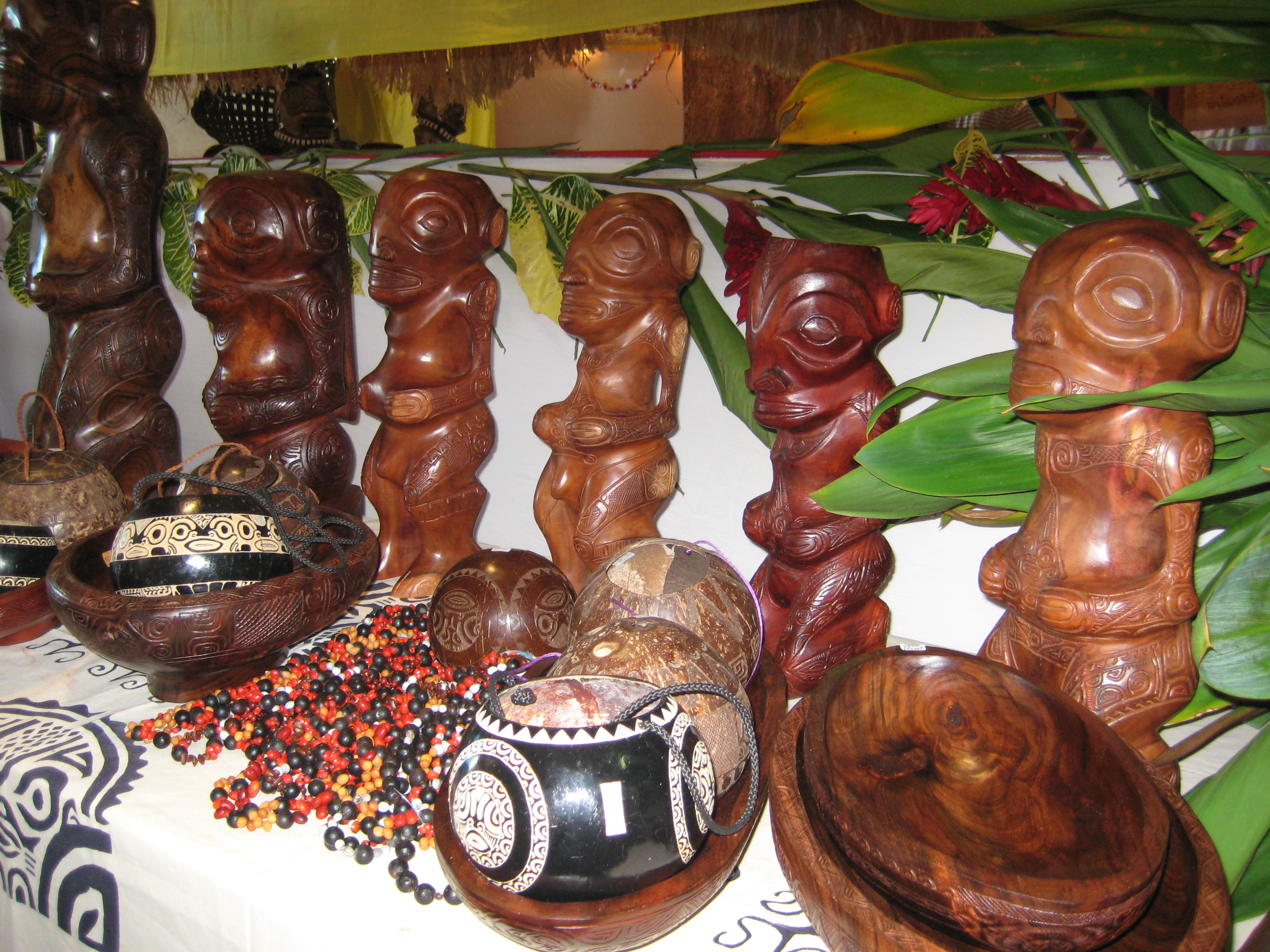
A display of wood carvings

In 1961, the Anthropological Papers of the American Museum of Natural History documented that "the number of Historic period wooden figures collected in the Marquesas attests to the amount of wood carving for monumental purposes". Ua Huka is particularly well known in the area for its wood carvings. Common objects include sculptural representations of Polynesian gods, humans and animals, and utilitarian items such as decorated bowls, paddles, and clubs. Toewood and rosewood are featured in the wood carvings from Nuku Hiva, with bowls and spears made from the former, while tables and chessboards are carved from the latter. The tiki figurine, "an anthropomorphic figure portrayed with huge oval eyes, arching brows and open mouth", is typical of the Marquesan arts. Though tikis are most common as stone statues, they are also familiar motifs in wood carving and tattoos in the islands. Patterns used for both wood carving and body decorating have been noted, such as the honu kea (woodlouse), mata hoata (brilliant eye), ka'ake (underarm curve), poka'a (wood block), and enata (man).

== Bibliography ==
- Cruising World (1989). Cruising World. Cruising World. ISSN 0098-3519.
- Dodge, Ernest Stanley (1976). Islands and Empires: Western Impact on the Pacific and East Asia. University Of Minnesota Press. ISBN 978-1-4529-0822-9.
- Handy, Willowdean Chatterson (1922). Tattooing in the Marquesas (Public domain ed.). The Museum.
- Kjellgren, Eric; Ivory, Carol S. (1 January 2005). Adorning the World: Art of the Marquesas Islands. Metropolitan Museum of Art. ISBN 978-1-58839-146-9.
