= History of wood carving =

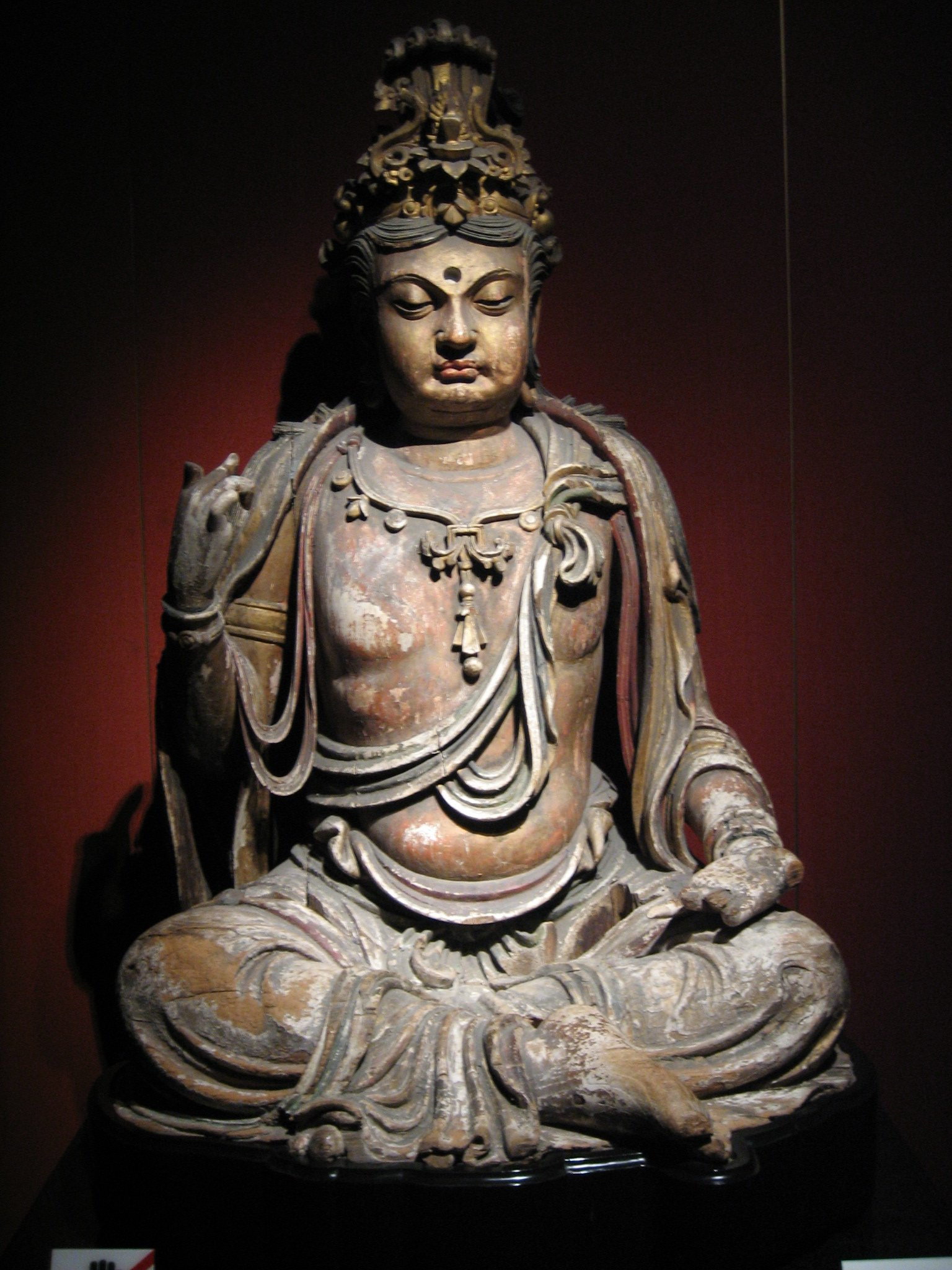
A Chinese wooden Bodhisattva, Jin dynasty (1115–1234), Shanghai Museum.

Wood carving is one of the oldest arts of humankind. Wooden spears from the Middle Paleolithic, such as the Clacton Spear, reveal how humans have engaged in utilitarian woodwork for millennia. However, given the relatively rapid rate at which wood decays in most environments, there are only isolated ancient artifacts remaining.

Indigenous People of North America carvings include many everyday objects such as wooden fishhooks and pipe stems. Similarly, Polynesian carving can be found on paddles and the tools of their trade. The natives of Guyana decorated their cassava grater with schemes of incised scrolls, while the natives of Loango Bay embellished their spoons with a design of figures standing up in full relief carrying a hammock. Wood carving is also present in their architecture.

The texture of wood often proves challenging when trying to create an expression and features of the face. However, the rough texture of the wood can lend itself to the more rugged features of the aging face. Examples exist of the "beetling" of brows, furrows, and lines, all enhanced by the natural defects of the grain of the wood.

In ancient work, the rough surface of the wood may not have been of such importance, since figures were, as a rule, painted both for protection and color. Even from the most ancient of times, color has always been a powerful tool to bring out the beauty and detail of woodcarvings and sculptures, adding depth and dimension to the artwork.

In the early 20th century, the Encyclopædia Britannica Eleventh Edition, on which much of this entry is based, commented, "Of late years, carving has gone out of fashion. The work is necessarily slow and requires substantial skill, making it expensive. Other and cheaper methods of decoration have driven carving from its former place. Machine work has much to answer for, and the endeavor to popularize the craft by means of the village class has not always achieved its own end. The gradual disappearance of the individual artist, elbowed out as he has been, by the contractor, is fatal to the continuance of an art that can never flourish when done at such a distance."

The art and craft of woodcarving continue to survive as demonstrated by the large number of woodcarvers who continue to practice and advance the tradition around the world.

== Ancient Egypt ==
Ancient Egyptian rowing boat model with crew. Museo Egizio, Turin.

The extreme dryness of the climate of Egypt accounts for the survival of a number of woodcarvings from this remote period. Some wood panels from the tomb of Hosul Egypt, at Sakkarah are of the III. dynasty. The carving consists of Egyptian hieroglyphs and figures in low relief, and the style is extremely delicate and fine. A stool shown on one of the panels has legs shaped like the fore and hind limbs of an animal, a form common in Egypt for thousands of years.

In the Cairo museum can be seen the statue of a man from the period of the Great Pyramid of Giza, possibly 4000 BC. The expression of the face and the realism of the carriage have never been surpassed by any Egyptian sculptor of this or any other period. The figure is carved out of a solid block of sycamore, and in accordance with Egyptian custom, the arms are joined on. The eyes are inlaid with pieces of opaque white quartz, with a line of bronze surrounding to imitate the lid; a small disk of transparent rock crystal forms the iris, while a tiny bit of polished ebony fixed behind the crystal imparts to it a lifelike sparkle. The IV., V. and VI. dynasties cover the finest period of Egyptian sculpture. The statues found in the tombs show a freedom of treatment which was never reached in later times. They are all portraits, which the artist strove his utmost to render exactly like his model. For these are not, like mere modern statues, simply works of art, but had primarily a religious signification (Maspero). As the spirits of the deceased might inhabit, these Ka statues, the features and proportions were closely copied.

There are to be found in the principal museums of Europe many Egyptian examples: mummy cases of human beings with the face alone carved, animal mummy cases, sometimes boxes, with the figure of a lizard, perhaps, carved in full Mummy relief standing on the lid. Sometimes the animal would be carved in the round and its hollowed body used as the case itself.

Of furniture, folding seats like the modern camp stool, and chairs with legs terminating in the heads of beasts or the feet of animals, still exist. Beds supported by lions' paws XI. and XII. dynasties, from Gebelein, now in the Cairo Museum, headrests, 6 or 8 in. high, shaped like a crutch on a foot, very like those used by the native of New Guinea today, are carved with scenes, etc., in outline. In the British Museum may be seen a tiny little coffer, 4 in. by 21/2 in., with very delicate figures carved in low relief. This little box stands on cabriole legs 3/4 of an inch long with claw feet, quite Louis Quinze in character. There are incense ladles, the handle representing a bouquet of lotus flowers, the bowl formed like the leaf of an aquatic plant with serrated edges from Gurnah during the XVIII. dynasty; mirror handles, representing a little pillar, or a lotus stalk, sometimes surmounted by a head of Hathor, the Egyptian Venus or of Bes, god of the toilet; pin-cushions, in the shape of a small round tortoise with holes in the back for toilet pins, which were also of wood with dog-head ends (XI. dynasty, Cairo Museum); and perfume boxes such as a fish, the two halves forming the bottom and top of the perfume or pomatum was removed by little wooden spoons, one shaped in the form of a cartouche emerging from a full-blown lotus, another shaped like the neck of a goose, a third consisting of a dog running with a fish in its closed mouth, the fish forming the bowl. The list might be prolonged, but enough has been said to show to what a pitch of refinement the art of wood-carving had reached thousands of years before the birth of Christ.

Of the work of Assyria, Greece and Rome, little is actually known except from history or inference. It may be safely assumed that the Assyrian craft kept pace with the varying taste and refinement of Greece and all the older civilizations. Important pieces of wooden Roman sculpture which once existed in Greece and other ancient countries are only known to us from the descriptions of Pausanias and other classic writers. Many examples of the wooden images of the gods, were preserved down to late historic times. The Palladium, or sacred figure of Pallas, which was guarded by the Vestal Virgins in Rome and was fabled to have been brought by Aeneas from the burning Troy, was one of these wooden figures.

== Western Europe ==
Great works of art were created in wood during the entire Middle Ages, e.g. in Cathedrals, Abbeys and other Church connected sites. These works demonstrated both craftsmanship and artistry.

=== First eleven centuries of CE ===
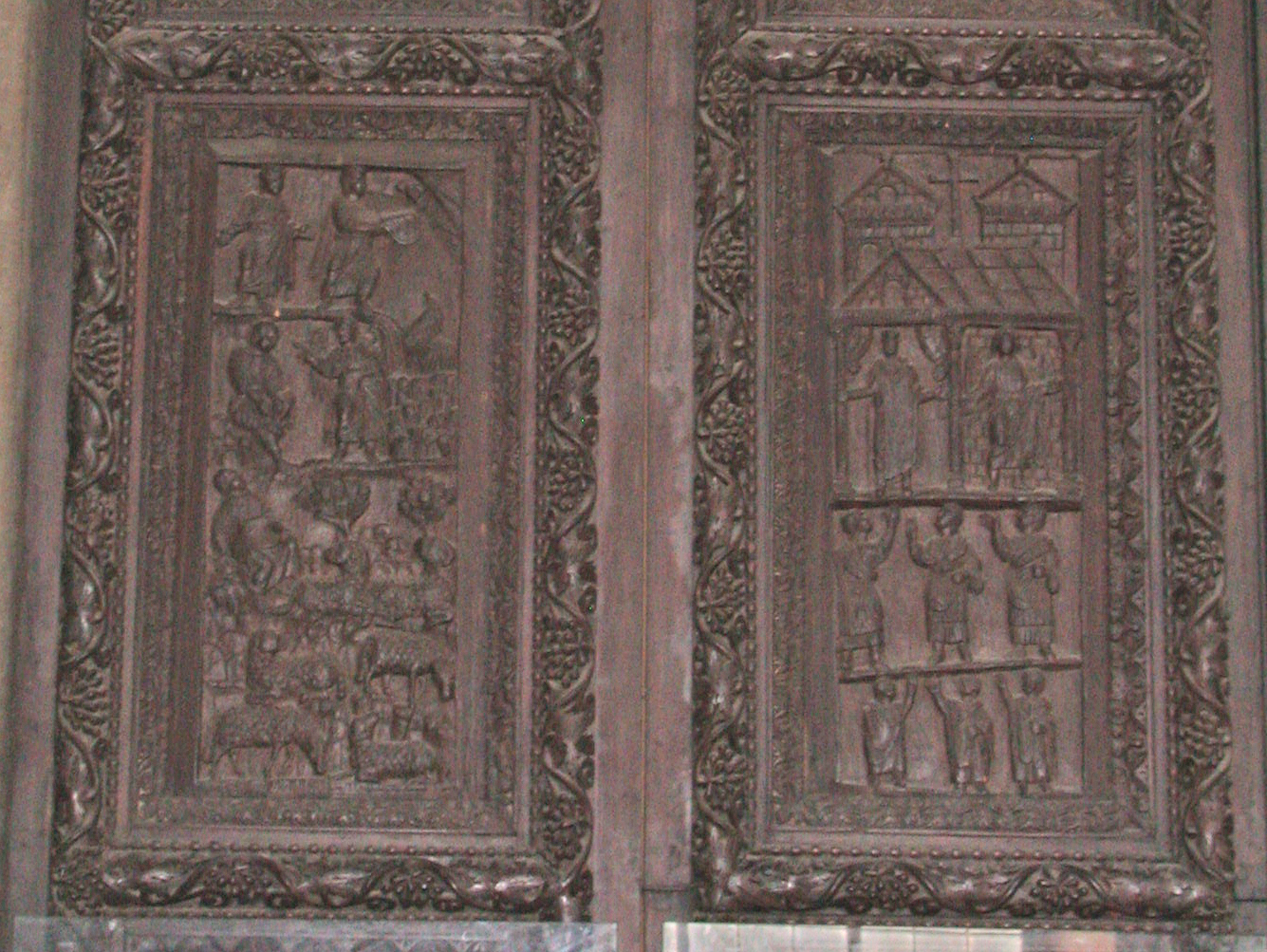
Detail from the carved portal, of St Sabina on the Aventine Hill, dating back from the 5th century

Wood-carving examples of the first eleven centuries of CE are rare due to the fact that woods do decay easily in 1,000 years. The carved panels of the main doors of St Sabina on the Aventine Hill, Rome, are very interesting specimens of early Christian relief sculpture in wood, dating, as the dresses show, from the 5th century. The doors are made up of a large number of small square panels, each minutely carved with a scene from the Old or New Testament. A very fine fragment of Byzantine art (11th or 12th century) is preserved in a monastery at Mount Athos in Macedonia. It consists of two panels (one above the other) of relief sculpture, surmounted by a semicircular arch of conventional foliage springing from columns ornamented with animals in foliage of spiral form. The capitals and bases are square, each face being carved with a figure. It is a wonderfully fine piece of work, conceived in the best decorative spirit.

In Scandinavian countries we find some very early work of excellent design, both Christian and Non-Christian in nature, as "The Christening" in that part of the world took place quite late in the first millennium CE. In the Christiania Museum there are some fine chairs. In the Copenhagen Museum there are panels from Iceland in the same style. The celebrated wooden doorways of Aal (1200 CE), Sauland, Flaa, Solder and other Norwegian churches (Christiania Museum) has dragons and intricate scrollwork, a style which we still see carried on in the doorposts of the 15th century in the Nordiska museum, Stockholm, and in the Icelandic work of quite modern times. In these early days the leaf was not much developed in design. The carver depended almost entirely on the stalk, a style of work which has its counterpart in Burmese work of the 17th century.

=== Gothic period (12th–15th centuries) ===
Towards the end of this epoch wood-carving reached its culminating point. The choir stalls, rood-screens, roofs, retables, of England, France and the Teutonic countries of Europe, have in execution, balance and proportion, never at any time been approached. In small designs, in detail, in minuteness, in mechanical accuracy, the carver of this time has had his rivals, but for greatness of architectural conception, for a just appreciation of decorative treatment, the designer of the 15th century stands alone.

Gothic statue in carved wood

It should always be borne in mind that color was the keynote of this scheme. The custom was practically universal, and enough traces remain to show how splendid was the effect of these old Gothic churches and cathedrals. The priests in their gorgeous vestments, the lights, the crucifix, the banners and incense, the frescoed or diapered walls, and that crowning glory of Gothic art, the stained glass, were all in harmony with these schemes of colored carved work. Red, blue, green, white and gilding were the tints as a rule used. Not only were the screens painted in colors, but the parts painted white were often further decorated with delicate lines and sprigs of foliage in conventional pattern. The plain surfaces of the panels were also adorned with saints, often on a background of delicate gesso diaper, colored or gilded (Southwold). Nothing could exceed the beauty of the triptychs or retables of Germany, Flanders or France; carved with scenes from the New Testament in high relief arranged under a delicate lacework of canopies and clustered pinnacles glistening with gold and brilliant colors. In Germany the effect was further enhanced by emphasizing parts of the gilding by means of a transparent varnish tinted with red or green, thus giving a special tone to the metallic luster.

The style of design used during this great period owes much of its interest to the now obsolete custom of directly employing the craftsman and his men, instead of the present-day habit of giving the work to a contractor. It is easy to trace how those bands of carvers traveled about from church to church. In one district the designer would employ a particular form and arrangement of vine leaf, while in another adjoining quite a different style repeatedly appears. The general scheme was of course planned by one mastermind, but the carrying out of each section, each part, each detail, was left to the individual workman. Hence that variety of treatment, that endless diversity, which gives a charm and interest to Gothic art, unknown in more symmetrical epochs. The Gothic craftsman appreciated the cardinal fact that in design beautiful detail does not necessarily ensure a beautiful composition, and subordinated the individual part to the general effect. He also often carved in situ, a practice seldom if ever followed in the present day. Here and there one comes across the work of long years ago still unfinished. A half-completed bench-end, a fragment of screen left plain, clearly show that sometimes at least the church was the workshop.

=== Gothic and Renaissance: A comparison ===
Gothic design roughly divides itself into two classes:

1. the geometrical, i.e. tracery and diaper patterns, and
2. the foliage designs, where the mechanical scroll of the Renaissance is as a rule absent.

The lines of foliage treatment, so common in the bands of the 15th-century roodscreens and the panel work especially of Germany, serve to illustrate the widely different motives of the craftsmen of these two great epochs. Again, while the Renaissance designer as a rule made the two sides of the panel alike, the Gothic carver seldom repeated a single detail. While his main lines and grouping corresponded, his detail differed. Of numberless examples a 15th-century chest (Plate III. fig. 6) in the Kunstgewerbemuseum Berlin may be referred to. The arrangements of foliage, etc., on top, back and front, are typical of Gothic at its best.

=== End of the 12th century ===
As this section treats of woodcarving in Europe generally, and not of any one country alone, the dates just named must be of necessity only approximate. The 13th century was marked not only by great skill both in design and treatment, but also much devotional feeling. The craftsman seems to have not merely carved, but to have carved to the glory of God. At no time was work more delicately conceived or more beautifully cut. This early Gothic style certainly lent itself to fine finish, and in this respect was more suited to stone treatment than to wood. But the loving care bestowed on each detail seems to point to a religious devotion which is sometimes absent from later work. Very good examples of capitals (now, alas, divided down the center) are to be seen in Peterborough cathedral. Scrolls and foliage spring from groups of columns of four. Some Italian columns of the same date (Victoria and Albert Museum) should be compared, much to the advantage of the former. Exeter Cathedral boasts misericords unsurpassed for skillful workmanship; mermaids, dragons, elephants, masks, knights and other subjects introduced into foliage, form the designs. Salisbury cathedral is noted for its stall elbows, and the reredos in the south transept of Adisham, Kent, is another fine example testifying to the great skill of the 13th-century woodcarvers. A very interesting set of stalls, the early history of which is unknown, was placed in Barming church, Kent, about the year 1868. The book rest ends are carved with two scrolls and an animal standing between, and the ends of the stalls with figure sculpture:

=== 1300–1380 ===
During this period foliage forms, though still conventional, more closely followed nature. The canopy work of the choir of Winchester contains exquisite carvings of oak and other leaves. The choir stalls of Ely and Chichester and the tomb of Edward III. in Westminster Abbey are all fine examples of this period. Exeter boasts a throne that of Bishop Stapledon (1308–1326) standing 57 ft (17 m) high, which remains unequaled for perfection of proportion and delicacy of detail. In France the stalls of St Benoit-sur-Loire, Lisieux, and Évreux are good 14th-century examples. But little Gothic work is now to be seen in the churches of this country. It is to the museums we have to look for traces of the old Gothic carvers. The two retables in Dijon Museum, the work of Jacques de Baerze (1301), a sculptor of Flanders, who carved for Philippe le Hardi, Duke of Burgundy, are masterpieces of design and workmanship. The tracery is of the very finest, chiefly gilt on backgrounds of diapered gesso.

=== 1380–1520 ===
Towards the end of the 14th century carvers gave up natural foliage treatment to a great extent, and took to more conventional forms. The oak and the maple no longer inspired the designer, but the vine was constantly employed. A very large amount of 15th-century work remains to us, but the briefest reference only can be made to some of the more beautiful examples.

The rood screen was now universal. It consisted of a tall screen about thirty feet. high, on the top of which rested a loft, i.e. a platform rood about 6 ft (1.8 m). in width guarded on either side by a gallery screen, and either on the top or in front of that, facing the nave, was placed the rood, i.e. a large crucifix with figures of St Mary and St John on either side. This rood screen sometimes spanned the church in one continuous length (Leeds, Kent), but often filled in the aisle and chancel arches in three separate divisions (Church Handborough, Oxon.). The loft was as a rule approached by a winding stair built in the thickness of the aisle wall. The lower part of the screen itself was solid paneled to a height of about 3 ft 6 in (1.07 m) and the upper part of this paneling was filled in with tracery (Carbrook, Norfolk), while the remaining flat surfaces of the panels were often pictured with saints on a background of delicate gesso diaper (Southwold, Suffolk). Towards the end of this period the employment of figures became less common as a means of decoration, and the panels were sometimes filled- entirely with carved foliage (Swimbridge, Devon). The upper part of the rood screen consisted of open arches with the heads filled in with pierced tracery, often enriched with crockets (Seaming, Norfolk), embattled transoms (Hedingham Castle, Essex), or floriated cusps (Eye, Suffolk). The mullions were constantly carved with foliage (Cheddar, Somerset), pinnacles (Causton, Norfolk), angels (Pilton, Devon), or decorated with canopy work in gesso (Southwold). But the feature of these beautiful screens was the loft with its gallery and vaulting. The loft floor rested on the top of the rood screen and was usually balanced and kept in position by means of a groined vaulting (Harberton, Devon) or a cove (Eddington, Somerset). The finest examples of vaulting are to be seen in Devon. The bosses at the intersections of the ribs and the carved tracery of the screen at Honiton stand unrivaled. Many screens still possess the beam which formed the edge of the loft floor and on which the gallery rested. It was here that the medieval rood screen carver gave most play to his fancy, and carved the finest designs in foliage to be seen throughout the whole Gothic period. Although these massed moulds, crests and bands have the appearance of being carved out of one log, they were in practice invariably built up in parts, much of the foliage, etc., being pierced and placed in hollow moulds in order to increase the shadow. As a rule, the arrangement consisted of a crest running along the top, with a smaller one depending from the lower edge, and three bands of foliage and vine between them (Feniton, Devon). The designs of vine leaves at Kenton, Bow and Dartmouth, all in Devon, illustrate three treatments of this plant. At Swimbridge, Devon, there is a very elaborate combination; the usual plain beads which separate the bands are carved with twisted foliage also. At Abbots Kerswell and other places in the district round Totnes the carvers introduced birds in the foliage with the best effect. The variety of cresting used is very great. That at Winchcomb, Gloucester, consists of dragons combined with vine leaves and foliage. It illustrates how Gothic carvers sometimes repeated their patterns in as mechanical a way as the worst workmen of the present time. Little can be said of the galleries, so few remain to us. They were nearly all pulled down when the order to destroy the roods was issued in 1548. That they were decorated with carved saints under niches (St Anno's Church, Llananno, Wales), or painted figures (Strencham, Worcester), is certain from the examples that have survived the Reformation. At Atherington. Devon, the gallery front is decorated with the royal coat of arms, other heraldic devices, and with prayers. The Breton screen at St Fiacre-le-Faouet is a wonderful example of French work of this time, btit does not compare with the best English examples. Its flamboyant lines and its small tracery never obtained any foothold in England, though screens carved in this way (Colebrook, Devon) are sometimes to be found.

The rood was sometimes of such dimensions as to require some support in addition to the gallery on which it rested. A carved beam was used from which a chain connected the rood itself. At Cullompton, Devon, such a beam still exists, and is carved with foliage; an open cresting ornaments the under side and two angels support the ends. This particular rood stood on a base of rocks, skulls and bones, carved out of two solid logs averaging 18 in. wide and 21 in. high, and together measuring 15 ft 6 in (4.72 m) long; there are round holes along the top which were probably used for lights.

No country in Europe possesses roofs to equal those of England created in the 15th century. The great roof of Westminster Hall remains to the present day unique. In Norfolk and Suffolk roofs abound of the hammerbeam class; that at Woolpit, Suffolk, achieves the first rank of quality. Each bracket is carved with strongly designed foliage, the end of every beam terminates in an angel carrying a shield, and the purlins are crested, while each truss is supported by a canopied riche (containing a figure) resting on an angel corbel. Here, too, as at Ipswich and many other churches, there is a row of angels with outspread wings under the wall-plate. This idea of angels in the roof is a very beautiful one, and the effect is much enhanced by the coloring. The roof at St Nicholas, King's Lynn, is a magnificent example of tie beam construction. The trusses are filled in with tracery at the sides and the centres more or less open, and the beams, which are crested and embattled, contain a row of angels on either side. In Devon, Cullompton possesses a very fine semicircular ceiling supported at intervals by ribs pierced with carving. Each compartment is divided up into small square panels, crossed by diagonal ribs of cresting, while every joint is ornamented with a boss carved in the decorative way peculiar to the Gothic craftsman. The nave roof of Manchester cathedral is nearly flat, and is also divided up into small compartments and bossed; the beams are supported by carved brackets resting on corbels with angels at each base.

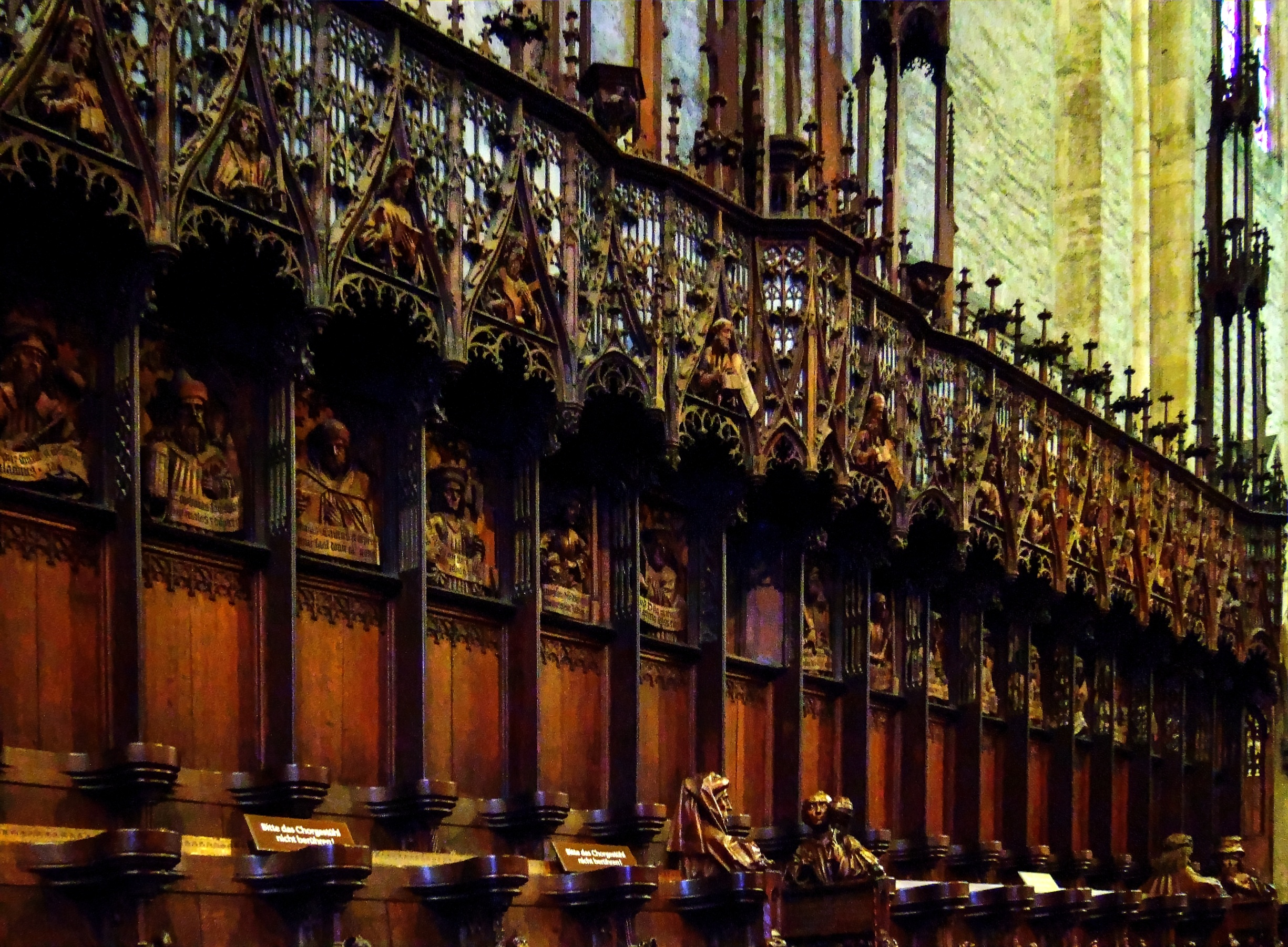
Choir stalls in the Ulm Münster by Jörg Syrlin t.E. (ca. 1470)

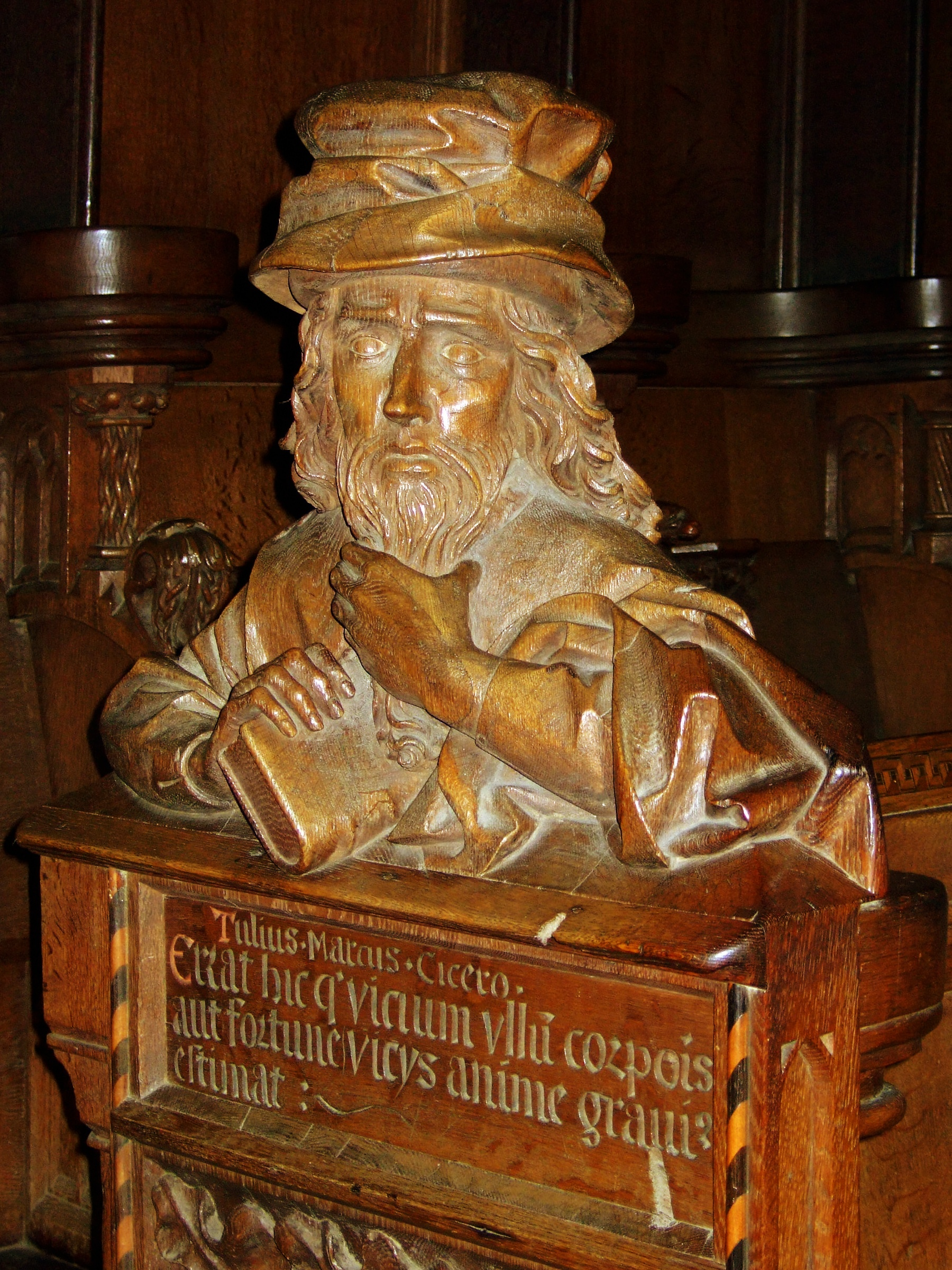
Bust of Cicero by Jörg Syrlin t.E., in the Ulm Münster

In the 15th century, choir stalls with their canopies continued to increase in magnificence. Manchester cathedral (middle of 15th century) and Henry VII chapel in Westminster Abbey (early 16th) are good examples of the fashion of massing ~7~7 pinnacles and canopies; a custom which hardly compares with the more simple beauty of the 14th-century work of Ely cathedral. The stalls of Amiens cathedral were perhaps the finest in the world at the beginning of the 16th century. The cresting employed, though common on the Continent, is of a kind hardly known in England, consisting as it does of arches springing from arches, and decorated with crockets and finials. The tabernacle work over the end seats, with its pinnacles and flying buttresses, stretches up towards the roof in tapering lines of the utmost delicacy. The choir stalls (the work of Jörg Syrlin the Elder) in Ulm Minster are among the finest produced by the German carver. The front panels are carved with foliage of splendid decorative boldness, strength and character; the stall ends were carved with foliage and sculpture along the top edge, as was sometimes the case in Bavaria and France as well as Germany.

In early times the choir alone possessed seats, the nave being left bare. Gradually benches were introduced, and during the 15th century became universal. The poppyhead form of B ornament now reached perfection and was constantly used enc for seats other than those of the choir. The name refers en a. to the carved finial which is so often used to complete the top of the bench end and is peculiarly English in character. In Devon and Cornwall, it is rarely met with (Ilsington, Devon). In Somerset it is more common, while in the eastern counties thousands of examples remain. The quite simple fleur-de-lys form of poppyhead, suitable for the village, is seen in perfection at Trunch, Norfolk, and the very elaborate form when the poppyhead springs from a crocheted circle filled in with sculpture, at St Nicholas, King's Lynn. Often the foliage contained a face (St Margaret's, Cley, Norfolk), or the poppyhead consisted of figures or birds only (Thurston, Suffolk) or a figure standing on a dragon (Great Brincton, Northampton); occasionally the traditional form was departed from and the finial carved like a lemon in outline (Bury St Edmuncis) or a diamond (Tirley, Glos.). In Denmark an ornament in the form of a large circle sometimes takes the place of the English poppy-head. In the Copenhagen Museum there is a set of bench ends of the 15th century with such a decoration carved with coats of arms, interlacing strap-work, etc. But the old 15th-century bench end did not depend entirely on the poppy-head for its embellishment. The side was constantly enriched with elaborate tracery (Dennington, Norfolk) or with tracery and domestic scenes (North Cadbury, Somerset), or would consist of a mass of sculpture in perspective, with canopy work, buttresses and sculptured niches, while the top of the bench end would be crowned with figures carved in the round, of the finest craftsmanship. Such work at Amiens cathedral is a marvel alike of conception, design and execution. In the Kunstgewerbemuseum Berlin some stall ends are to be seen. Out of a dragon's mouth grows a conventional tree arranged and balanced in excellent proportion. On another, stall end a tree is carved growing out of the mouth of a fool. This custom of making foliage grow out of the mouth or eyes is hardly defensible, and was by no means confined to any country or time. We have plenty of Renaissance examples of the same treatment.

Before the 15th century, preaching had not become a regular institution in England, and pulpits were not so common. However, the value of the sermon began to be appreciated from the use to which the Lollards and other sects put this method of teaching doctrine, and pulpits became a necessity. A notable one exists at Kenton, Devon. It is, as is generally the case, octagonal, and stands on a foot. Each angle is carved with an upright column of foliage between pinnacles, and the panels, which are painted with saints, are enriched with carved canopies and foliage; it is, however, much restored. The pulpit at Trull, Somerset, is noted for its fine figure carving. A large figure standing under a canon fills each of the panelled sides. while many other smaller figures help to enrich the general effect. Examples of Gothic sounding boards are very rare; that, together with the pulpit, in the choir of Winchester is of the time of Prior Silkstede (1520), and is carved with his rebus, a skein of twisted silk.

The usual form of font cover during the hundred years before the Reformation was pyramidal, the ribs of the salient angles being Fo straight and cusped (Frindsbury, Kent) or of curved outline and cusped (St Mildred, Canterbury). There is a very charming one of this form at Colebrook, Devon. It is quite plain but for a little angel kneeling on the top, with its hands clasped in prayer. But the most beautiful form is the massed collection of pinnacles and canopy work, of which there is such a fine example at Sudbury, Suffolk. It was not uncommon to carve a dove on the topmost pinnacle (Castleacre, Norfolk), in allusion to the descent of the Holy Spirit. The finest font in England is undoubtedly that of Ijiford, Suffolk. It rises some 20 ft (6.1 m). in height, arid when the panels were painted with saints and the exquisite tabernacle work colored and gilded, must have been a masterpiece of Gothic craftsmanship. A cord connecting the tops of these covers with the roof or with a carved beam standing out from the wall, something like a crane (Salle, Norfolk), was used to remove the cover on the occasion of baptism.

Many lecterns of the Gothic period do not exist today. They usually had a double sloping desk which revolved round a central moulded post. The lectern at Swanscombe, Kent, has an eras, circle of good foliage ornamenting each face of the book rest, and sonic tracery work at either end. The box form is more common in France than in England, the pedestal of such a lectern being surrounded by a casing of three or more sides. A good example with six sides is in the church of Vance (France), and one of triangular form in the Muse of Bourges, while a four-sided box lectern is still in use in the church of Lenham, Kent. The Gothic prayer desk, used for private devotional purposes, is hardly known in England, but is not uncommon on the Continent. There is an example of one in the Muse, Bourges; the front and sides of the part for kneeling are carved with that small tracery of flowing character so common in France and Belgium during the latter part of the 15th century, and the back, which rises to a height of 6 ft (1.8 m)., contains a little crucifix with traceried decoration above and below.

A word should be said about the ciboria, so often found on the Oboria continent of Europe. In tapering arrangement of tabernacle work they rival the English font covers in delicacy of outline (Muse, Rouen).

Numbers of doors are to be met with not only in churches but also in private houses. Lavenham, Suffolk, is rich in work of this latter class. In England the general custom was to carve the head of the door only with tracery (East Brent, Somerset), but in the Tudor period doors were some times covered entirely with linenfold paneling (St Albans Abbey). This form of decoration was exceedingly common on the Continent as well as in England. In France the doors towards the latter part of the 15th century were often square-headed, or perhaps had the corners rounded. These doors were usually divided into some six or eight oblong panels of more or less equal size. One of the doors of Bourges Cathedral is treated thus, the panels being filled in with very good tracery enriched with crockets and coats of arms. But a more restrained form of treatment is constantly employed, as at the church of St Godard, Rouen, where the upper panels only are carved with tracery and coats of arms and the lower adorned with simple linenfold design.

In Spain and the Teutonic countries of Europe, the retable; the Reformation accounting for the absence in England of any work of this kind. The altar-piece in Schleswig cathedral was carved by Hans Bruggerman, and consists, like many others, of a number of panels filled with figures standing some four or five deep. The figures in the foremost rows are carved entirely separate, while the background is composed of figure work and architecture, etc., in diminishing perspective. The panels are grouped together under canopy work. The work of the carver shows itself in the large variety of the facial expression of the figures all instinct with life and movement. In France few retables exist outside the museums. In the little church of Marissel, not far from Beauvais, there is a retable consisting of eleven panels, the crucifixion being, of course, the principal subject. And there is an example from Antwerp in the Muse Cluny, Paris; the pierced tracery work which decorates the upper part being a good example of the style composed of interlacing segments of circles so common on the Continent during late Gothic times and but seldom practiced in England. ln Spain the cathedral of Valladolid was famous for its retable, and Alonso Cano and other sculptors frequently used wood for large statuary, which was painted in a realistic way with lifelike effect. Denmark also possessed a school of able wood-carvers who imitated the great altar-pieces of Germany. A very large and well-carved example still exists in the cathedral of Roskilde. But besides these altarpieces tiny little models were carved. Triptychs and shrines, among other components, measuring a few inches were filled in with tracery and figures that excite the utmost wonder. In the British Museum there is such a triptych (Flemish, I 511); the center panel, measuring an inch or two square, is crowded with figures in full relief and in diminishing perspective, after the custom of this period. This rests on a semicircular base which is carved with the Lord's Supper, and is further ornamented with figures and animals. The whole thing inclusive measures about 9 in. high, and, with the triptych wings open, 5 in. wide. There is another piece, also Flemish, in the Wallace collection.

With regard to paneling generally, there were, during the last fifty years of the period now under review, three styles of design followed by most European carvers, each of which attained great notoriety. Firstly, a developed form of small panelling, tracery, which was very common in France and the Netherlands. A square-headed panel would be filled in with small detail of flamboyant character, the perpendicular line or mullion being subordinate, as in the German chasse (Muse Cluny), and in some cases absent, as the screen work of Évreux cathedral shows. Secondly, the linenfold design. The great majority of examples are of a very conventional form, but at Bere Regis, Dorsetshire, the designs with tassels, and at St Sauvur, Caen, those with fringe work. At the beginning of the 16th century yet another pattern became the fashion. The main lines of the design consisted of flat hollow mouldings sometimes in the form of interlacing circles (Gatton, Surrey), at other times chiefly straight (Rochester cathedral), and the intervening spaces would be filled in with cusps or sprigs of foliage. It marks the last struggle of this great school of design to withstand the oncoming flood of the new art, the great Renaissance. From this time onward Gothic work, in spite of various attempts, has never again taken a place in domestic decoration. The lines of the tracery style, the pinnacle, and the crockett unequaled as they have always been in devotional expression are universally considered unsuited for decoration in the ordinary house.

Little reference can be made to the domestic side of the period which ended with the dawn of the 16th century, because so few remains exist. At Bayeux, Bourges, Reims and preeminently Rouen, we see by the figures of saints, bishops or virgins, how much the religious feeling of the Middle Ages entered into the domestic life. In England the carved corner post (which generally carried a bracket at the top to support the overhanging storey) calls for comment. In Ipswich, there are several such posts. On one house near the river, that celebrated subject, the fox preaching to geese, is carved in graphic allusion to the dissemination of false doctrine.

Of mantelpieces, there is a good example in the Rouen Museum. The overhanging corners are supported by dragons and the plain mouldings have little bunches of foliage carved at either end, a custom as common in France during the 15th century as it was in England a century earlier; the screen. beam at Eastbourne parish church, for example.

As a rule, cabinets of the 15th century were rectangular in plan. In Germany and Austria, the lower part was often enclosed, as well as the upper; the top, middle and lower rails being carved with geometrical design or with bands of foliage (Museum, Vienna). But it was also the custom to make these cupboards with the corners cut off, thus giving five sides to the piece of furniture. A very pretty instance, which is greatly enhanced by the metal work of the lock plates and hinges, is in the Muse Cluny, and there are other good specimens with the lower part open in the Victoria and Albert Museum, London.

The chest was a very important piece of furniture, and is often to be met with covered with the most elaborate carving (Orleans Museum). There is a splendid chest (14th century) in the Cluny Museum; the front is carved with twelve knights in armour standing under as many arches, and the spandrels are filled in with faces, dragons and so on. But it is to the 15th century that we look for the best work of this class; there is no finer example than that in the Kunstgewerbemuseum Berlin. The front is a very animated hunting scene most decoratively arranged in a scheme of foliage, and the top bears two coats of arms with helms, crests and mantling. But the more general custom in chest decoration was to employ tracery with or without figure work; Avignon Museum contains some typical examples of the latter class.

A certain number of seats used for domestic purposes are of great interest. A good example of the long bench placed against the wall, with lofty panelled back and canopy over, is in the Musée Cluny, Paris. In the Museum at Rouen is a long seat of a movable kind with a low panelled back of pierced tracery, and in the Dijon Museum there is a good example of the typical chair of the period, with arms and high panelled and traceried back. There was a style of design admirably suited to the decoration of furniture when made of softwood such as pine. It somewhat resembled the Scandinavian treatment of the 10th–12th centuries already referred to. A pattern of Gothic foliage, often of beautiful outline, would be simply grounded out to a shallow depth. The shadows, curves and twists only being emphasized by a few well-disposed cuts with a V tool; and of course, the whole effect greatly improved by colour. A Swiss door of the 15th century in the Berlin Museum, and some German, Swiss and Tirolese work in the Victoria and Albert Museum, offer patterns that might well be imitated today by those who require simple decoration while avoiding the hackneyed Elizabethan forms.

It is hard to compare the figure work of England with that on the Continent owing to the disastrous effect of the Reformation. But when we examine the roofs of the Eastern counties, the bench ends of Somerset, or the misericords in many parts of the country, we can appreciate how largely wood sculpture was used for purposes of decoration. If as a rule the figure work, was I not of a very high order, we have conspicuous exceptions in the stall elbows of Sherborne, and the pulpit of Trull, Somerset. Perhaps the oldest instance is the often mutilated and often restored effigy of Robert, Duke of Normandy, in Gloucester Cathedral (12th century), and carved, as was generally the case in England, in oak. At Clifton Reynes, Buckingham, there are two figures of the 13th century. They are both hollowed out from the back in order to facilitate seasoning the wood and to prevent cracking. During the 13th, 14th and 15th centuries there are numberless instances of figure carving of the most graphic description afforded in the misericords in many of our churches and cathedrals. But of figures carved in the round apart from their surroundings hardly an instance remains. At the little chapel of Cartmel Fell, in the wilds of Westmorland, there is a figure of Our Lord from a crucifix, some 2 ft 6 in (0.76 m) in length. The cross is gone, the arms are broken away, and the feet have been burned off. A second figure of Our Lord (originally in the church of Keynes Inferior) is in the museum of Caerleon, and a third, from a church in Lincolnshire, is now in a private collection. On the continent some of the finest figure work is to be found in the retables, some of which are in the Victoria and Albert Museum. A Tirolese panel of the 15th century carved in high relief, representing St John seated with his back to the onlooker, is a masterpiece of perspective and foreshortening, and the drapery folds are perfect. The same may be said of a small statue of the Virgin, carved in lime by a Swiss hand, and some work of the great Tilman Riemenschneider of Würzburg (1460–1531) shows that stone sculptors of medieval times were not ashamed of wood.

=== Renaissance period (16th–17th centuries) ===
With the beginning of the 16th century, the Renaissance began to elbow its way in to the exclusion of Gothic design. But the process was not sudden, and much transition work was done. The rood screen at Hurst, Berkshire, the stall work of Cartmel Priory, Westmorland, and the bench ends of many of the churches in Somerset, give good illustrations. But the new style was unequal to the old in devotional feeling, except in classic buildings like St Paul's Cathedral, where the stalls of Grinling Gibbons better suit their own surroundings. The rest of this article will therefore be devoted in the main to domestic work, and the exact location of examples can only be given when not the property of private owners or where the public have access.

During the 16th century the best work is undoubtedly to be found on the Continent. France, Germany and the Netherlands producing numberless examples not only of house decoration but of furniture as well. The wealth of the newly discovered American continent was only one factor which assisted in the civilizing influence of this time, and hand in hand with the spread of commerce came the desire for refinement. The custom of building houses chiefly in wood wherever timber was plentiful continued. Pilasters took the place of pinnacles, and vases or dolphins assisted the acanthus leaf to oust the older forms of design. House fronts of wood gave ample scope to the carver. That of Sir Paul Pinder (1600), formerly in Bishopsgate, but now preserved in the Victoria and Albert Museum, is a good example of decorative treatment without overloading. The brackets carved in the shape of monsters which support the projecting upper storey are typical of hundreds of dwellings, as for instance St Peters Hospital, Bristol. The panels, too, of Sir Paul Pinders house are good examples of that Jacobean form of medallion surrounded by scroll work which is at once as decorative as it is simple.

In England that familiar style known as Elizabethan and Jacobean prevailed throughout the 16th and 17th centuries. At the present time hardly a home in the land has not its old oak chest carved with the familiar half circle or scroll border along the top rail, or the arch pattern on the panels. The court cupboards, with their solid or open under parts and upper cornice supported by turned balusters of extravagant thickness, are to be seen wherever one goes. And chairs, real as well as spurious, with solid backs carved in the usual flat relief, are bought up with an avidity inseparable from fashion. Four-post bedsteads are harder to come by. The back is usually broken up into small panels and carved, the best effect being seen in those examples where the paneling or the framework only is decorated. The dining-hall tables often had six legs of great substance, which were turned somewhat after the shape of a covered cup, and were carved with foliage bearing a distant resemblance to the acanthus. Rooms were generally panelled with oak, sometimes divided at intervals by flat pilasters and the upper frieze carved with scroll work or dolphins. But the feature which distinguished the period was the fire mantle. It always must be the principal object in a room, and the Elizabethan carver fully appreciated this fact. By carving the chimney breast as a rule to the ceiling and covering the surrounding walls with more or less plain paneling, the designer, by thus concentrating the attention on one point, often produced results of a high order. Caryatid figures, pilasters and friezes were among the customary details employed to produce good effects. No finer example exists than that lately removed from the old palace at Bromley-by-Bow to the Victoria and Albert Museum. The mantel shelf is 6 ft (1.8 m). from the ground and consists of a deep quadrant mould decorated with flat scroll work of good design. The supporting pilasters on either side are shaped and moulded in the customary Jacobean manor and are crowned by busts with Ionic capitals on the heads. Above the shelf the large center panel is deeply carved with the royal coat of arms with supporters and mantling, and on either side a semicircular arched niche contains a figure in classic dress. The Elizabethan carver often produced splendid staircases, sometimes carving the newel posts with heraldic figures bearing coats of arms, etc. The newels of a staircase at Highgate support different types of Cromwellian soldiers, carved with great vivacity and life. But in spite of excellent work, as for example the gallery at Hatfield, the carving of this period did not, so far as England was concerned, compare with other epochs, or with contemporary work in other parts of Europe. Much of the work is badly drawn and badly executed. It is true that good decorative effects were constantly obtained at the very minimum of cost, but it is difficult to discover much merit in work which really looks best when badly cut.

In France this flat and simple treatment was to a certain extent used. Doors were most suitably adorned in this way, and the split baluster so characteristic of Jacobean work is often to be met with. There are some very good cabinets in the museum at Lyngby, Denmark, illustrating these two methods of treatment in combination. But the Swiss and Austrians elaborated this style, greatly improving the effect by the addition of color. However, the best Continental designs adopted the typical acanthus foliage of Italy, while still retaining a certain amount of Gothic feeling in the strength of the lines and the cut of the detail. Panelling often long and narrow was commonly used for all sorts of domestic purposes, a feature being a medallion in the center with a simple arrangement of vase, dolphins, dragons, or birds and foliage filling in the spaces above and below.

The cabinets of the Netherlands and Belgium were usually arranged in two storeys with a fine moulded and carved cornice, mid division and plinth. The pilasters at the sides, and small raised panels carved only on the projecting part, would compose a very harmonious whole. A proportion of the French cabinets are decorated with caryatids not carved in the best taste, and, like other French woodwork of this period, are sometimes overloaded with sculpture. The doors of St Maclou, Rouen, fine as they are, would hardly to-day be held up as models for imitation. A noteworthy set of doors belong to the Oudenaarde Town Hall. The central door contains twelve and that on either side eight panels, each of which is carved with Renaissance foliage surrounding an unobtrusive figure. In the Palais de Justice we see that great scheme of decoration which takes up the whole of the fireplace end of the hall. Five large figures carved in the round are surrounded by small ones and with foliage and coats of arms.

In Italy, the birthplace of the Renaissance, there is much fine work of the 16th century. A very important school of design was promoted by Raphael, whose patterns were used or adapted by a large number of craftsmen. The shutters of Raphaels Stanze in the Vatican, and the choir stalls in the church of St Pietro de Cassinesi at Perugia, are notable examples of this style of carving. The work is in slight relief, and carved in walnut with those graceful patterns which Raphael developed out of the newly discovered remains of ancient Roman wall painting from the palace of Nero and other places. In the Victoria and Albert Museum are many examples of Italian work: the door from a convent near Parma, with its three prominent masks and heavy gadroon moulds; a picture frame with a charming acanthus border and, egg and tongue moulds on either side; and various marriage chests in walnut covered with very elaborate schemes of carving. It is sometimes difficult to distinguish Spanish, or for that matter South of France work, from Italian, so much alike is the character. The Spaniards yield to none in good workmanship. Some Spanish panels of typical Italian design are in the Victoria and Albert Museum as well as cabinets of the purest Renaissance order. There is a wonderful Portuguese coffer (17th century) in this section. The top is deeply carved in little compartments with scenes from the life of Our Lord.

=== 17th–18th centuries ===
In England, the great school of Grinling Gibbons arose. Although he carved many mouldings of conventional form (Hampton Court Palace, Chatsworth, etc.), his name is usually associated with a very heavy form of decoration which was copied direct from nature. Great swags of drapery and foliage with fruit and dead birds, etc., would be carved in lime a foot thick. For technical skill these examples are unsurpassed; each grape would be undercut, the finer stalks and birds legs stand out quite separate, and as a consequence soon succumb to the energy of the housemaid's broom. Good work of this class is to be found at Petworth; Trinity College, Oxford; Trinity College, Cambridge; St Pauls cathedral; St James, Piccadilly; and many other London churches.

During the reigns of Louis XIV. and XV. the principal merit of carved design, i.e. its appropriateness and suitability, gradually disappeared. Furniture was often carved in a way hardly legitimate. The legs, the rails of tables and chairs, the frames of cabinets, of looking-glasses, instead of being first made fcr construction and strength. and then decorated, were first designed to carry cherubs heads and rococo (i.e. rock and shell ornament), quite regardless of utility or convenience. A wealth of such mistaken design was also applied to state carriages, to say nothing of bedsteads and other furniture. However, the wall paneling of the mansions of the rich, and sometimes the paneling of furniture, was decorated with rococo design in its least illegitimate form. The main part of the wood surface would be left plain, while the center would be carved with a medallion surrounded by foliage, vases or trophies of torches and musical instruments, etc., or perhaps the upper part of the panel would be thus treated. France led the fashion, which was more or less followed all over Europe. In England gilt chairs in the style of Louis XV. were made in some quantities. But Thomas Chippendale, Ince and Mayhew, Sheraton, Johnson, Heppelwhite and other cabinet-makers did not as a rule use much carving in their designs. Scrolls, shells, ribbon, ears of corn, etc., in very fine relief, were, however, used in the embellishment of chairs, etc., and the claw and ball foot was employed as a termination to the cabriole legs of cabinets and other furniture.

The mantelpieces of the 18th century were, as a rule, carved in pine and painted white. Usually, the shelves were narrow and supported by pilasters often of flat elliptic plan, sometimes by caryatids, and the frieze would consist of a raised center panel carved with a classic scene in relief, or with a mask alone, and on either side a swag of flowers, fruit and foliage.

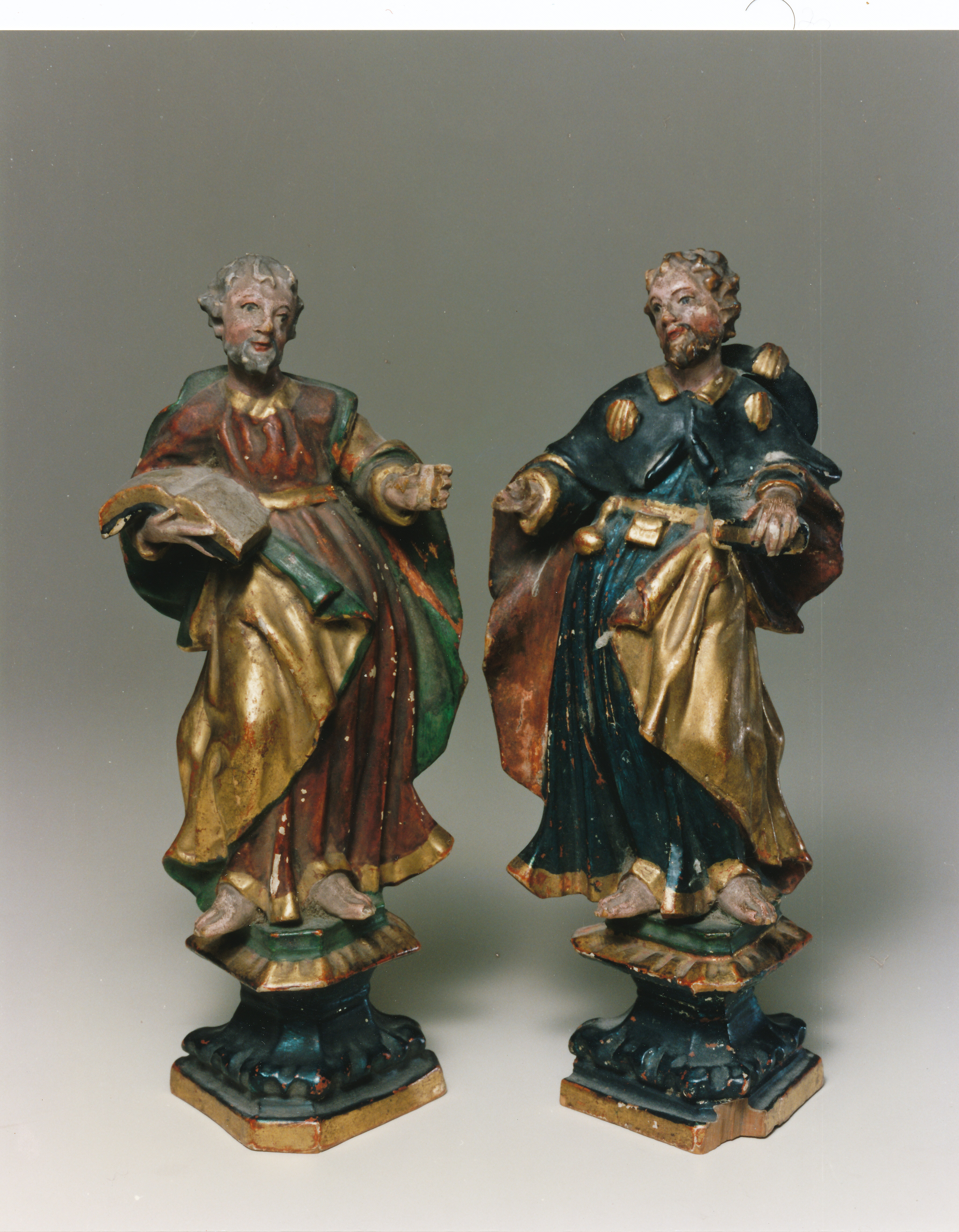
Baroque woodcarved apostles from Val Gardena

Interior doorways were often decorated with a broken pediment more or less ornate, and a swag of foliage commonly depended from either side over a background of scroll work. The outside porches so often seen in Queen Anne houses were of a character peculiar to the 18th century. A small platform or curved roof was supported by two large and heavy brackets carved with acanthus scroll work. The staircases were as a rule exceedingly good. Carved and pierced brackets were fixed to the open strings (i.e. the sides of the steps), giving a very pretty effect to the graceful balustrade of turned and twisted columns.

Renaissance figure work calls for little comment. During the 16th century many good examples were produced those priestly statues in the museum of Sens for example. But the figure work used in the decoration of cabinets, etc., seldom rose above the ordinary level. In the 18th century cherubs heads were fashionable, and statuettes were sometimes carved in boxwood as ornaments, but as a means of decorating houses wood sculpture ceased to be. The Swiss, however, have kept up their reputation for animal sculpture to the present day, and still turn out cleverly carved chamois and bears, etc.; as a rule the more sketchily cut the better the merit. Their more ambitious works, their groups of cows, etc., sometimes reach a high level of excellence.

Between the 17th and 18th century a florid woodcarving industry started in the Gardena valley, which is now located in the Italian province of South Tyrol. A network of people from that valley traveled on foot to all European cities, as far as to Lisbon and Saint Petersburg, to sell the products of hundreds of carvers. Finally in the 19th century in Gardena, mainly wooden toys and dolls known also as Dutch dolls or penny dolls, were carved by the millions of pieces. The Museum Gherdëina in Urtijëi displays a large collection of examples of woodcarvings from that region.

Gilded woodcarving in Portugal and Spain continued to be produced, and the style exported to their New World colonies, and the Philippines, Macao and Goa.

=== 19th century to present day ===
Of the work of the 19th century onward little can be said in praise. Outside and beyond the present-day fashion for collecting old oak there seems to be no demand for carved decoration. In church work a certain number of carvers find occupation, as also for repairs or the production of imitations. But the carving one is accustomed to see in hotels or on board the modern ocean palace is in the main the work of the machine, often with finishing work done by human workers.

Nonetheless, the 1800s saw the teaching of woodcarving became formalized in several European countries. For example, the Austrian woodcarver Josef Moriggl (1841–1908) had a long career as a teacher, culminating in his appointment in 1893 as Professor at the Staats-Gewerbeschule (Craft School) in Innsbruck, where he served until his retirement in 1907.

In Gröden the institution of an art school in 1820 improved considerably the skills of the carvers. A new industrial branch developed with hundreds of artists and artisans dedicated to sculpture and manufacturing of statues and altars in wood exported to the whole world. Unfortunately, the machine-carving industry, initiated in the 1950s and the Second Vatican Council, caused hundreds of carvers in Val Gardena to quit their craft. A worldwide trade of machine-carved figurines and statues ensued.

== Eastern Europe ==
Romania contains a region that is very well known for their wooden Orthodox churches, some of which have been preserved since for centuries. Alongside their church tradition, Romania had two famous woodcarvers from the 20th century, Constantin Brâncuşi and Gheza Vida. Their woodcarving connects deeply to their personal convictions, including Brâncuşi's faith in Christianity, as well as historical events, like the killing of 29 Romanians during World War II.

== Coptic ==
In the early medieval period screens and other fittings were produced for the Coptic churches of Egypt by native Christian workmen. In the British Museum, there is a set of ten small cedar panels from the church door of Sitt Miriam, Cairo (13th century). The six sculptured figure panels are carved in very low relief and the four foliage panels are quite Oriental in character, intricate and fine both in detail and furnish. In the Cairo Museum, there is much work treated, after the familiar Arab style, while other designs are quite Byzantine in character. The figure work is not of a very high order.

== Islamic work ==
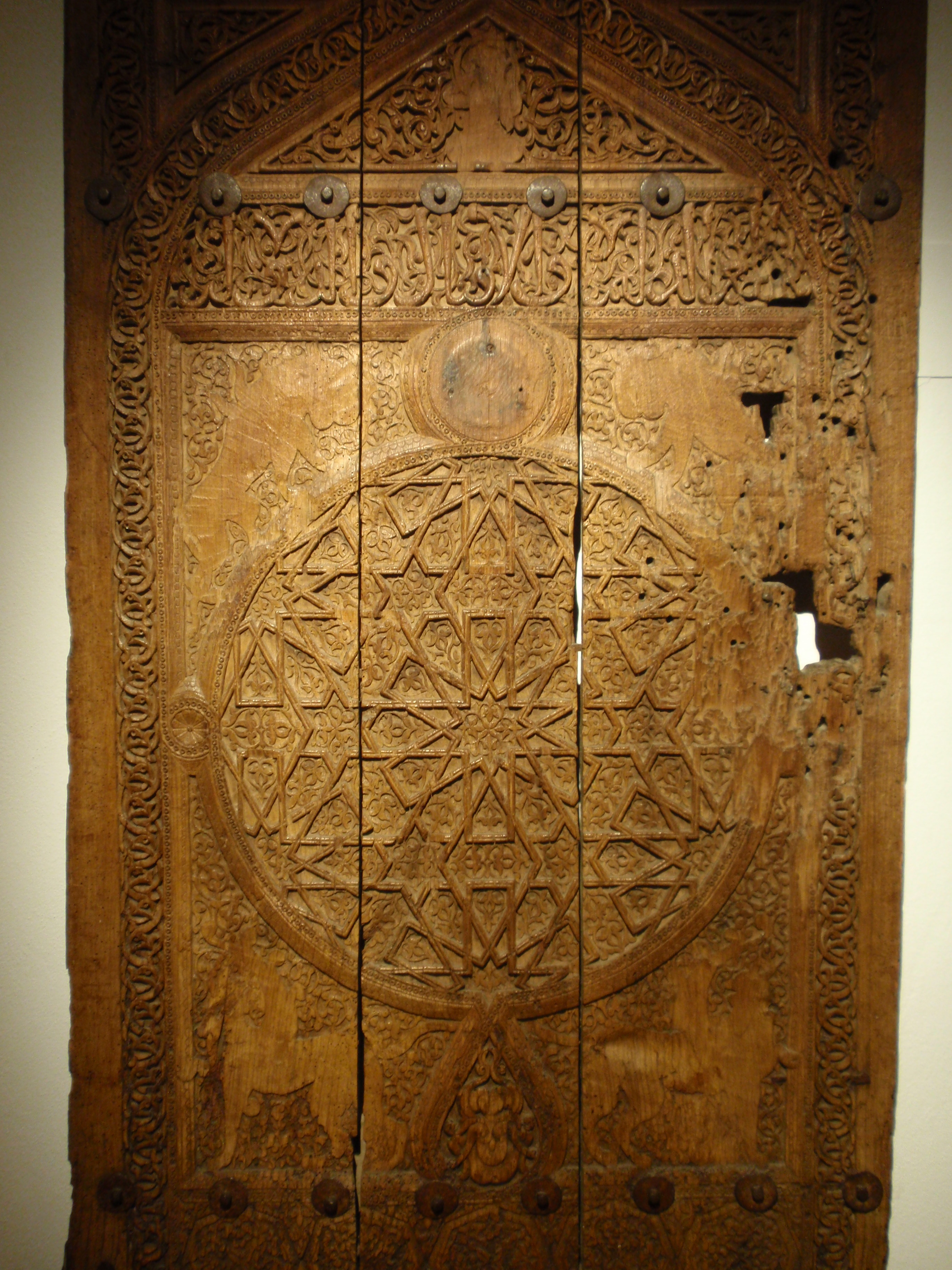
Turkish and Islamic Arts Museum, Istanbul

Muslim wood-carvers of Persia, Syria, Egypt and Spain are renowned for their skill, designed and executed the richest paneling and other decorations for wall linings, ceilings, pulpits and all kinds of fittings and furniture.The mosques and private houses of Cairo, Damascus and other Oriental Cities are full of the most elaborate and minutely delicate woodwork. A favorite style of ornament was to cover the surface with very intricate interlacing patterns, formed by finely moulded ribs; the various geometrical spaces between the ribs were then filled in with small pieces of wood carved with foliage in slight relief. The use of different woods such as ebony or box, inlaid so as to emphasize the design, combined with the ingenious richness of the patterns, give this class of woodwork an almost unrivaled splendour of effect. Carved ivory is also often used for the filling in of the spaces. The Arabs are past masters in the art of carving flat surfaces in this way. A gate in the mosque of the sultan Bargoug (Cairo, 14th century) well illustrates this appreciation of lines and surfaces. The pulpit or mimbar (15th century) from a Cairo mosque, now in the Victoria and Albert Museum, is also a good example in the same style, the small spaces in this case being filled in with ivory carved in flat relief.

Screens made up of labyrinths of complicated joinery, consisting of multitudes of tiny balusters connecting hexagons, squares or other forms, with the flat surfaces constantly enriched with small carvings, are familiar to every one. In Cairo we also have examples in the mosque of Qous (12th century) of that finely arranged geometrical interlacing of curves with foliage terminations which distinguishes the Saracenic designer. Six panels in the Victoria and Albert Museum (13th century), and work on the tomb of the sultan Li Ghoury (16th century), show how deeply this form of decoration was ingrained in the Arab nature. Figure work and animals were sometimes introduced, in medieval fashion, as in the six panels just referred to, and at the hôpital du Moristan (13th century) and the mosque of El Nesfy Qeycoun (14th century). There is a magnificent panel on the door of Beyt-el-Emyr. This exquisite design is composed of vine leaves and, grapes of conventional treatment in low relief. The Arab designer was fond of breaking up his paneling in a way reminding one of a similar Jacobean custom. The main panel would be divided into a number of hexagonal, triangular or other shapes, and each small space filled in with conventional scroll work. Much of this simple flat design reminds one of that Byzantine method from which the Elizabethan carvers were inspired.

== Persia ==
The Persian carvers closely followed Arab design. A pair of doors of the 14th century from Samarkand (Victoria and Albert Museum) is typical. Boxes, spoons and other small articles were often fretted with interlacing lines of Saracenic character, the delicacy and minuteness of the work requiring the utmost patience and skill. Many of the patterns remind one, of the sandalwood work of Madras, with the difference that the Persians were satisfied with a much lower relief. Sometimes a very beautiful result was obtained by the sparing rise of fretted lattice pattern among foliage. A fine panel of the 14th century in the Victoria and Albert Museum shows how active was Arab influence even as far as Bokhara.

== India and Burma ==
Throughout the great Indian subcontinent, woodcarving of the most luxurious kind has been continuously produced for many centuries. The ancient Hindu temples were decorated with doors, ceilings and various fittings carved in teak and other woods with patterns of extreme richness and minute elaboration. Many doors, columns, galleries, or even entire house-fronts are covered with the most intricate design bewildering to behold (Bhera, Shahpur). But this is not always the case, and the Oriental is at times more restrained in his methods. Architectural detail is to be seen with enrichment carved around the framing. Hindu treatment of the circle is often exceedingly good, and might perhaps less rarely inspire western design. Foliage, fruit and, flowers are constantly adapted to a scheme of fret-cut decoration for doors or windows as well as the frames of chairs and the edges of tables. Southern Indian wood carvers are known to work often with sandalwood, always covered with design, where scenes or characters from Hindu mythology occupy space. Many of the gong stands of Burma show the highest skill; the arrangement of two figures bearing a pole from which a gong hangs is familiar. In the region of Uttarakhand, India, there is a wood carving tradition known as Likhai. This tradition uses flora, fauna, and religious carvings, among other symbols, and has been passed down from generation to generation. Because of this recognizable style, the entire region is easily identifiable. These decorations are on both houses and places of worship. The current tradition is in peril due to more people joining the service sector of business.

== Indochina and the Far East ==
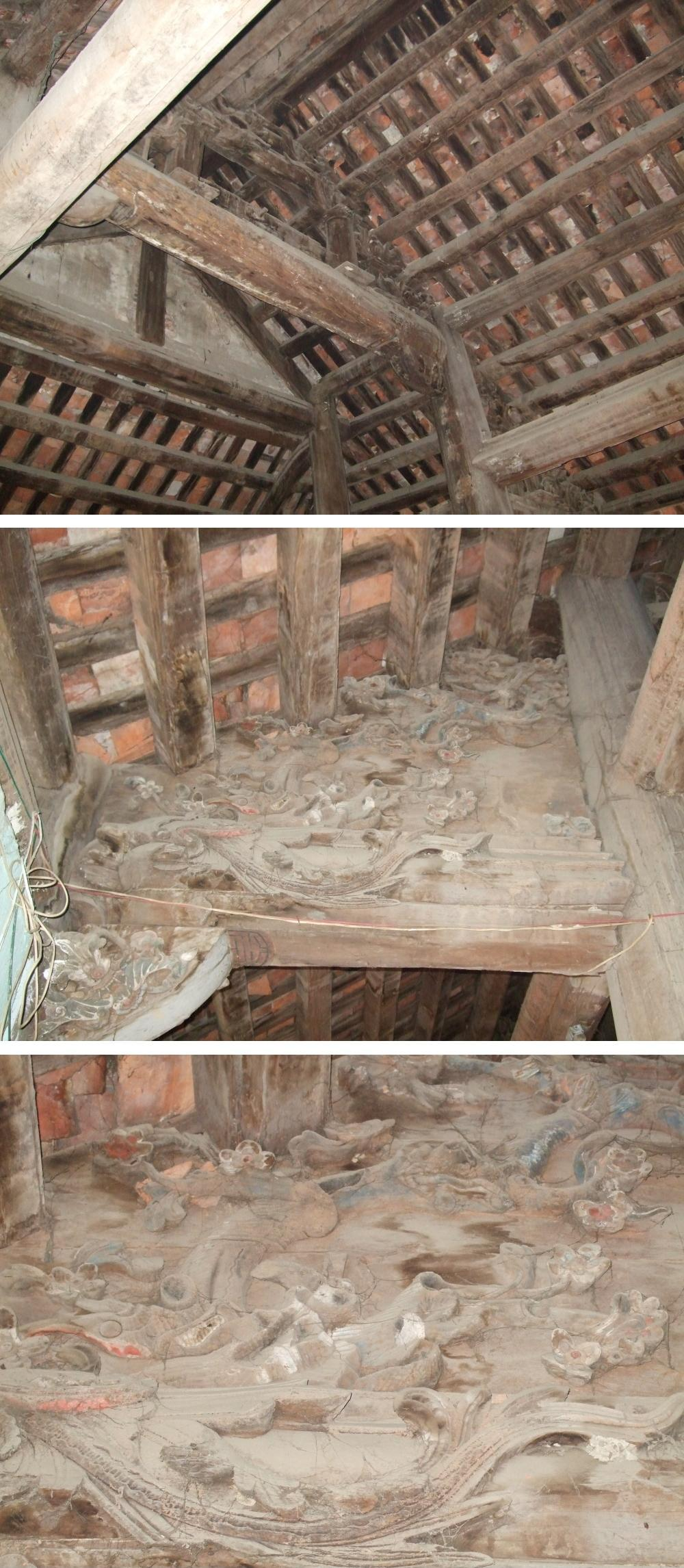
Details of a Vietnamese wooden ceiling

In these countries the carver is unrivaled for deftness of hand. Grotesque and imitative work of the utmost perfection is produced, and many of the carvings of these countries, Japan in particular, are beautiful works of art, especially when the carver copies the lotus, lily or other aquatic plant. A favorite form of decoration consists of breaking up the architectural surfaces, such as ceilings, friezes, and columns, into framed squares and filling each panel with a circle, or diamond of conventional treatment with a spandrels in each corner. A very Chinese feature is the finial of the newel post, so constantly left more or less straight in profile and deeply carved with monsters and scrolls. A heavily enriched moulding bearing a strong resemblance to the gadroon pattern is commonly used to give emphasis to edges, and the dragon arranged in curves imitative of nature is frequently employed over a closely designed and subordinated background.

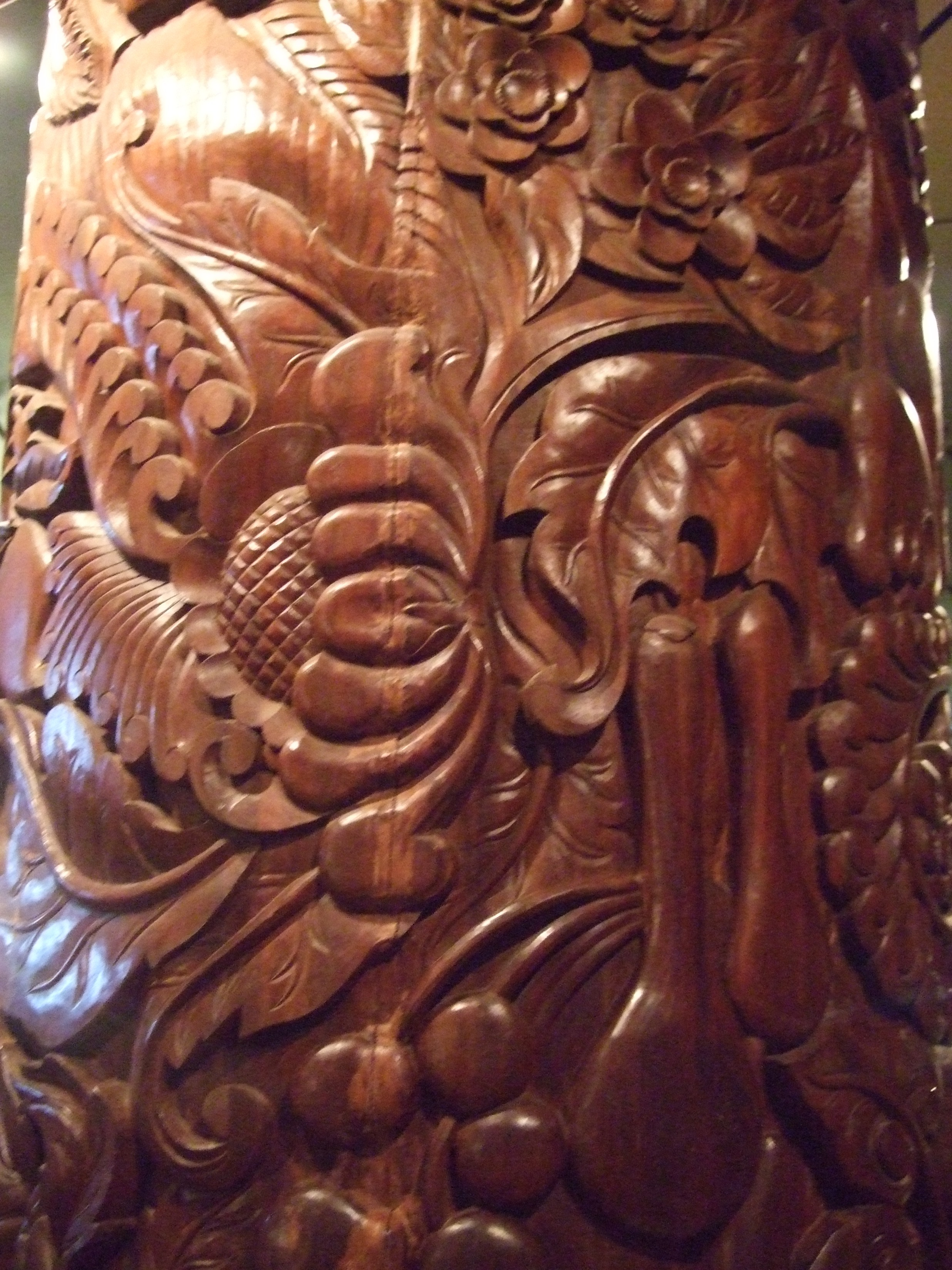
Detail of a Vietnamese wooden column

The general rule that in every country designers use much the same means whereby a pattern is obtained holds good in China. There are forms of band decoration here which closely resemble those of Gothic Europe, and a chair from Turkestan (3rd century) might almost be Elizabethan, so like are the details. Screens of grill form, often found in the historically Islamic countries, are common, and the deeply grounded, closely arranged patterns of Bombay also have their counterparts. The imperial dais in the Chien-Ching Hall, Beijing, is a masterpiece of intricate design. The back consists of one central panel of considerable height, with two of lesser degree on either side luxuriously carved. The whole is crowned with a very heavy crest of dragons and scroll work; the throne also is a wonderful example of carved treatment, and the doors of a cabinet in the same building show how rich an effect of foliage can be produced without the employment of stalk or scroll. One might almost say, he wastes his talent on such an ungrateful material as wood. In this material fans and other trifles are carved with a delicacy that courts disaster.

In Japan much of the Chinese type is apparent. The native carver is fond of massing foliage without the stalk to lead him. He appears to put in his foliage, fruit and flowers first and then to indicate a stalk here and there, thus reversing the order of the Western method. Such a treatment, especially when birds and beasts are introduced, has the highest decorative effect. But, as such close treatment is bound to do, it depends for success to some extent upon its scheme of color. A long panel in the Victoria and Albert Museum, depicting merchants with their packhorse, strongly resembles in its grouping and treatment Gothic work of the 15th century, as for example the panel of St Hubert in the museum at Châlons. The strength and character of Japanese figure work is quite equal to the best Gothic sculpture of the 15th century.

== North America ==
Inside of Mexico, contemporary Oaxacan Woodcarvings have been extremely popular for over a century. These works were made to be sold to tourists. While before other wooden objects were carved, Oaxacan Woodcarvings mark the start of the popular style now seen today. As time passed, they became a much more popular attraction because of their unique style and brightly colored paint. Today, they have become a collectors item and a part of the economy in the Oaxaca region of Mexico. With the age of digitalization and marketing, these carvings have a global popularity and can have an expensive cost associated with owning one.

== Other cultures ==
The Eleventh Edition of the Encyclopædia Britannica describes chip carving (using knives or chisels to remove chips from a flat piece of wood) and decorated surfaces using incised lines as present all over the world, and also states that relief carving is common worldwide.

The Encyclopædia describes the style of the Cook Islands, a pattern formed by small triangles and squares entirely covering a surface and sometimes varied by a band of different arrangement as without equal for patience or accuracy. It also states that Fijians employ chip designs rivaling those of Europe in variety and that carvers from the Marquesas Islands appreciate the way in which plain surfaces contrast and emphasize decorated parts, restricting their work to bands of decoration or special points. It notes that Māori carving uses scrollwork and carvings for decoration, especially of houses, and that art from New Guinea also uses scrollwork, which it compares to guilloché and Scandinavian work.

It also states that the Ijaw people of Nigeria "design their paddles in a masterly way, and show a fine sense of proportion between the plain and the decorated surface". Their designs, though slightly in relief, are of the chip nature. It claims that in art by Indigenous Americans, the twist in various shapes is a favorite treatment of pipe stems.
