= Moriggl =

Moriggl is a surname. Notable people with the surname include:

- Barbara Moriggl (born 1982), Italian cross-country skier
- Josef Moriggl (1841–1908), Austrian master woodcarver and teacher
- Thomas Moriggl (born 1981), Italian cross-country skier
