= Court cupboard =

Type of sideboard

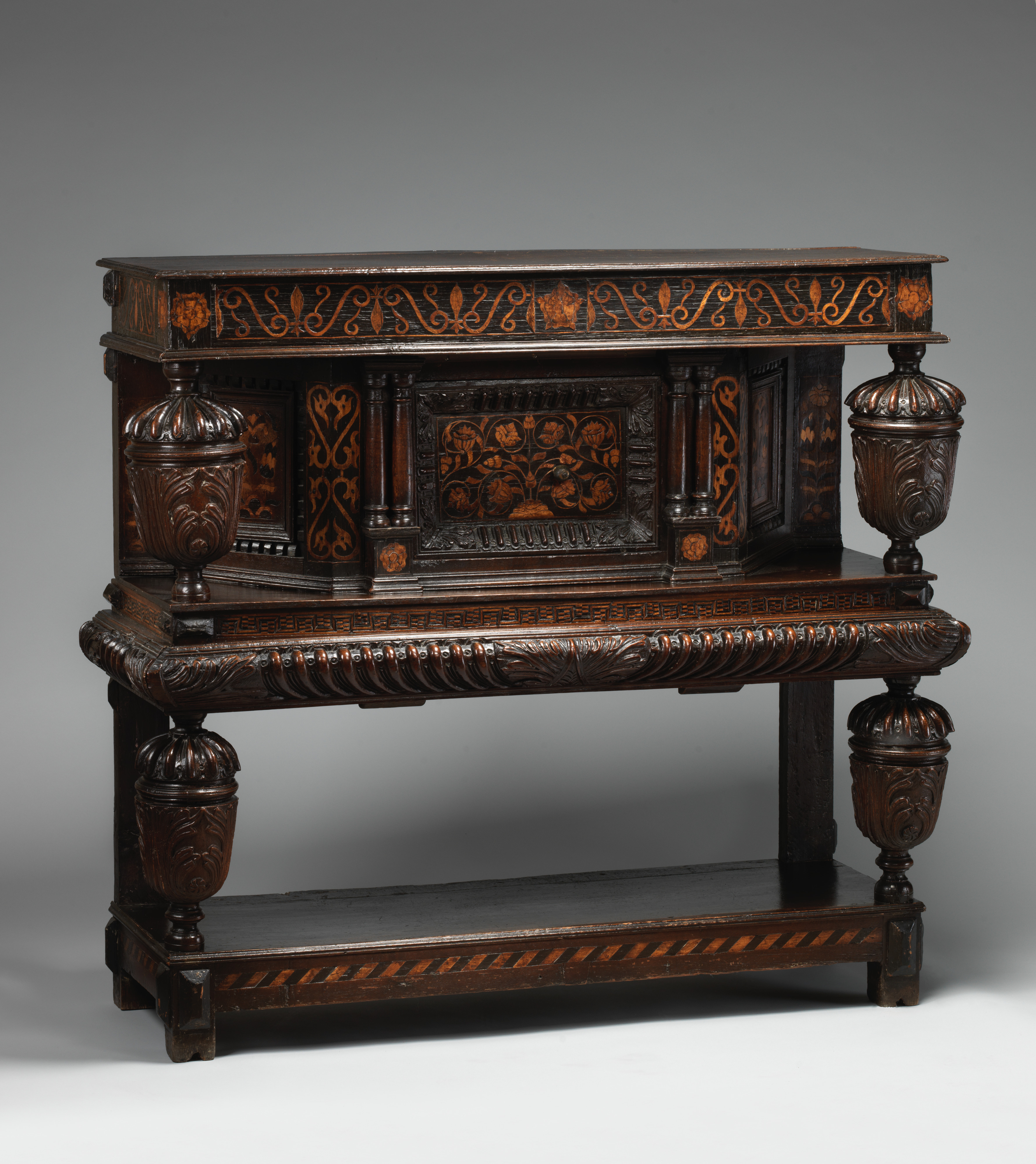
British court cupboard circa 1585, The Metropolitan Museum of Art

A court cupboard is a type of sideboard with three tiers used to store plates and platters. It was popular in the 16th and first three quarters of the 17th century in Northern Europe.
