= Josef Moriggl =

Josef Moriggl (1841–1908) was a master woodcarver and teacher whose work covered both religious and folk themes. Examples of his intricately detailed carvings, sculptures, and furniture can be found today in churches and private collections, mainly in his native Austria but also abroad.

== Early years and career ==
Josef Moriggl was born in 1841 in Nauders, a village in the Tirolean district of Landeck. His early artistic training began with a high school course in drawing, where his artistic aptitude was first apparent. He went on to study at the Mayersche Kunstanstalt (Art School) in Munich and completed his studies at the Craft Trade Institute in Vienna.

In 1873, Moriggl was hired as an instructor by the woodcarving school in Taufers, where he stayed for seven years. In 1880 he became Director of the woodcarving school in Hall. During that time he not only taught but took on many private commissions. His eminence in the field was recognized in 1893 when he was named Professor at the Staats-Gewerbeschule (Craft School) in Innsbruck. He retained that post until his retirement on February 28, 1907. He died 28 October 1908 in Innsbruck, and was survived by two sons, Josef and Hugo.

== Artistic achievements ==
Although Moriggl was adept in several media, he is best known as an outstanding carver of wooden sculptures. A prime of example of this work, contained in a private collection in England, is a 60 cm high carving of a Tirolean peasant in the act of releasing a bowling ball. It is carved from a single piece of pearwood, and the wood is stained rather than painted in a variety of muted colours. The exact date of carving is not known, but it is recorded as having been given as a wedding present in 1891. A folkloric "Shoe-slapping Group" is recorded as having been created in 1898. Other notable works had religious themes, including a collection of angels exhibited in Innbruck’s Heimat church (1871), a Virgin (1885), a St. Cecilia (1887), several statues of Christ, and a “Lufterweibchen” created for the Anglers Guild (1903). Also outstanding are a life-sized statue of Mary (and "Immaculata") for a convent in Stams and two angels for the parish church in Nauders.

He also carved wooden tables and cabinet decorations, and created small framed pictures showing coloured Tirolean costumes and folk themes. Many of the latter were made for export to Russia, though these were probably not signed.

Moriggl’s work was presented in exhibitions in Munich in 1876 and in Paris in 1878, where he was awarded a medal and honorary prize.
